

407001–407100 

|-bgcolor=#d6d6d6
| 407001 ||  || — || September 15, 2009 || Kitt Peak || Spacewatch || — || align=right | 2.8 km || 
|-id=002 bgcolor=#d6d6d6
| 407002 ||  || — || September 15, 2009 || Kitt Peak || Spacewatch || — || align=right | 4.6 km || 
|-id=003 bgcolor=#d6d6d6
| 407003 ||  || — || September 15, 2009 || Kitt Peak || Spacewatch || EOS || align=right | 2.6 km || 
|-id=004 bgcolor=#d6d6d6
| 407004 ||  || — || September 15, 2009 || Kitt Peak || Spacewatch || — || align=right | 2.8 km || 
|-id=005 bgcolor=#d6d6d6
| 407005 ||  || — || September 15, 2009 || Kitt Peak || Spacewatch || — || align=right | 2.9 km || 
|-id=006 bgcolor=#d6d6d6
| 407006 ||  || — || September 15, 2009 || Kitt Peak || Spacewatch || — || align=right | 4.5 km || 
|-id=007 bgcolor=#d6d6d6
| 407007 ||  || — || September 15, 2009 || Kitt Peak || Spacewatch || — || align=right | 2.6 km || 
|-id=008 bgcolor=#d6d6d6
| 407008 ||  || — || September 15, 2009 || Kitt Peak || Spacewatch || — || align=right | 3.1 km || 
|-id=009 bgcolor=#d6d6d6
| 407009 ||  || — || September 15, 2009 || Kitt Peak || Spacewatch || — || align=right | 1.9 km || 
|-id=010 bgcolor=#d6d6d6
| 407010 ||  || — || September 16, 2009 || Kitt Peak || Spacewatch || — || align=right | 2.0 km || 
|-id=011 bgcolor=#d6d6d6
| 407011 ||  || — || September 16, 2009 || Kitt Peak || Spacewatch || — || align=right | 2.8 km || 
|-id=012 bgcolor=#d6d6d6
| 407012 ||  || — || September 18, 2009 || Bisei SG Center || BATTeRS || EOS || align=right | 2.3 km || 
|-id=013 bgcolor=#FA8072
| 407013 ||  || — || September 19, 2009 || Catalina || CSS || H || align=right data-sort-value="0.71" | 710 m || 
|-id=014 bgcolor=#d6d6d6
| 407014 ||  || — || September 19, 2009 || Bisei SG Center || BATTeRS || NAE || align=right | 2.9 km || 
|-id=015 bgcolor=#d6d6d6
| 407015 ||  || — || September 22, 2009 || Marly || P. Kocher || EOS || align=right | 2.1 km || 
|-id=016 bgcolor=#d6d6d6
| 407016 Danielerdag ||  ||  || September 18, 2009 || Zelenchukskaya || T. V. Kryachko || THB || align=right | 3.4 km || 
|-id=017 bgcolor=#d6d6d6
| 407017 ||  || — || August 17, 2009 || Kitt Peak || Spacewatch || — || align=right | 1.8 km || 
|-id=018 bgcolor=#d6d6d6
| 407018 ||  || — || September 16, 2009 || Kitt Peak || Spacewatch || — || align=right | 3.6 km || 
|-id=019 bgcolor=#d6d6d6
| 407019 ||  || — || April 20, 2007 || Kitt Peak || Spacewatch || — || align=right | 2.9 km || 
|-id=020 bgcolor=#d6d6d6
| 407020 ||  || — || September 16, 2009 || Kitt Peak || Spacewatch || THM || align=right | 2.0 km || 
|-id=021 bgcolor=#d6d6d6
| 407021 ||  || — || September 16, 2009 || Kitt Peak || Spacewatch || EOS || align=right | 1.9 km || 
|-id=022 bgcolor=#d6d6d6
| 407022 ||  || — || September 16, 2009 || Kitt Peak || Spacewatch || — || align=right | 3.1 km || 
|-id=023 bgcolor=#d6d6d6
| 407023 ||  || — || September 16, 2009 || Kitt Peak || Spacewatch || EOS || align=right | 1.7 km || 
|-id=024 bgcolor=#d6d6d6
| 407024 ||  || — || September 16, 2009 || Kitt Peak || Spacewatch || — || align=right | 3.7 km || 
|-id=025 bgcolor=#d6d6d6
| 407025 ||  || — || September 16, 2009 || Kitt Peak || Spacewatch || — || align=right | 2.4 km || 
|-id=026 bgcolor=#d6d6d6
| 407026 ||  || — || September 16, 2009 || Kitt Peak || Spacewatch || — || align=right | 2.7 km || 
|-id=027 bgcolor=#d6d6d6
| 407027 ||  || — || September 16, 2009 || Kitt Peak || Spacewatch || — || align=right | 3.2 km || 
|-id=028 bgcolor=#fefefe
| 407028 ||  || — || September 16, 2009 || Kitt Peak || Spacewatch || H || align=right data-sort-value="0.70" | 700 m || 
|-id=029 bgcolor=#d6d6d6
| 407029 ||  || — || September 16, 2009 || Kitt Peak || Spacewatch || — || align=right | 3.2 km || 
|-id=030 bgcolor=#d6d6d6
| 407030 ||  || — || September 17, 2009 || Mount Lemmon || Mount Lemmon Survey || — || align=right | 2.9 km || 
|-id=031 bgcolor=#d6d6d6
| 407031 ||  || — || September 17, 2009 || Kitt Peak || Spacewatch || — || align=right | 2.7 km || 
|-id=032 bgcolor=#d6d6d6
| 407032 ||  || — || September 17, 2009 || Mount Lemmon || Mount Lemmon Survey || — || align=right | 2.1 km || 
|-id=033 bgcolor=#d6d6d6
| 407033 ||  || — || September 17, 2009 || Kitt Peak || Spacewatch || — || align=right | 3.6 km || 
|-id=034 bgcolor=#d6d6d6
| 407034 ||  || — || September 17, 2009 || Mount Lemmon || Mount Lemmon Survey || — || align=right | 2.0 km || 
|-id=035 bgcolor=#d6d6d6
| 407035 ||  || — || September 17, 2009 || Kitt Peak || Spacewatch || EOS || align=right | 2.0 km || 
|-id=036 bgcolor=#d6d6d6
| 407036 ||  || — || September 17, 2009 || Mount Lemmon || Mount Lemmon Survey || — || align=right | 2.4 km || 
|-id=037 bgcolor=#d6d6d6
| 407037 ||  || — || September 17, 2009 || Mount Lemmon || Mount Lemmon Survey || — || align=right | 2.3 km || 
|-id=038 bgcolor=#d6d6d6
| 407038 ||  || — || August 15, 2009 || Kitt Peak || Spacewatch || EOS || align=right | 2.1 km || 
|-id=039 bgcolor=#d6d6d6
| 407039 ||  || — || September 19, 2009 || Mount Lemmon || Mount Lemmon Survey || EMA || align=right | 2.4 km || 
|-id=040 bgcolor=#d6d6d6
| 407040 ||  || — || September 20, 2009 || Kitt Peak || Spacewatch || — || align=right | 3.2 km || 
|-id=041 bgcolor=#d6d6d6
| 407041 ||  || — || September 20, 2009 || Vitebsk || V. Nevski || TIR || align=right | 2.9 km || 
|-id=042 bgcolor=#d6d6d6
| 407042 ||  || — || September 21, 2009 || Mount Lemmon || Mount Lemmon Survey || — || align=right | 2.8 km || 
|-id=043 bgcolor=#d6d6d6
| 407043 ||  || — || September 16, 2009 || Kitt Peak || Spacewatch || — || align=right | 2.6 km || 
|-id=044 bgcolor=#d6d6d6
| 407044 ||  || — || April 9, 1996 || Kitt Peak || Spacewatch || EOS || align=right | 2.4 km || 
|-id=045 bgcolor=#d6d6d6
| 407045 ||  || — || September 18, 2009 || Bergisch Gladbach || W. Bickel || — || align=right | 2.6 km || 
|-id=046 bgcolor=#d6d6d6
| 407046 ||  || — || October 8, 2004 || Kitt Peak || Spacewatch || — || align=right | 3.4 km || 
|-id=047 bgcolor=#d6d6d6
| 407047 ||  || — || April 18, 2007 || Kitt Peak || Spacewatch || — || align=right | 3.3 km || 
|-id=048 bgcolor=#d6d6d6
| 407048 ||  || — || September 18, 2009 || Kitt Peak || Spacewatch || — || align=right | 2.2 km || 
|-id=049 bgcolor=#d6d6d6
| 407049 ||  || — || September 18, 2009 || Kitt Peak || Spacewatch || — || align=right | 2.0 km || 
|-id=050 bgcolor=#d6d6d6
| 407050 ||  || — || September 18, 2009 || Kitt Peak || Spacewatch || — || align=right | 2.5 km || 
|-id=051 bgcolor=#d6d6d6
| 407051 ||  || — || February 2, 2006 || Kitt Peak || Spacewatch || — || align=right | 2.7 km || 
|-id=052 bgcolor=#d6d6d6
| 407052 ||  || — || September 18, 2009 || Kitt Peak || Spacewatch || EOS || align=right | 2.1 km || 
|-id=053 bgcolor=#d6d6d6
| 407053 ||  || — || September 18, 2009 || Kitt Peak || Spacewatch || — || align=right | 2.7 km || 
|-id=054 bgcolor=#d6d6d6
| 407054 ||  || — || September 18, 2009 || Kitt Peak || Spacewatch || THM || align=right | 1.7 km || 
|-id=055 bgcolor=#d6d6d6
| 407055 ||  || — || September 18, 2009 || Kitt Peak || Spacewatch || — || align=right | 3.2 km || 
|-id=056 bgcolor=#d6d6d6
| 407056 ||  || — || September 19, 2009 || Kitt Peak || Spacewatch || — || align=right | 3.1 km || 
|-id=057 bgcolor=#E9E9E9
| 407057 ||  || — || September 19, 2009 || Mount Lemmon || Mount Lemmon Survey || — || align=right | 2.2 km || 
|-id=058 bgcolor=#d6d6d6
| 407058 ||  || — || November 17, 2004 || Campo Imperatore || CINEOS || — || align=right | 3.8 km || 
|-id=059 bgcolor=#d6d6d6
| 407059 ||  || — || September 20, 2009 || Mount Lemmon || Mount Lemmon Survey || — || align=right | 2.8 km || 
|-id=060 bgcolor=#d6d6d6
| 407060 ||  || — || September 20, 2009 || Kitt Peak || Spacewatch || — || align=right | 4.7 km || 
|-id=061 bgcolor=#d6d6d6
| 407061 ||  || — || September 20, 2009 || Kitt Peak || Spacewatch || THM || align=right | 2.0 km || 
|-id=062 bgcolor=#d6d6d6
| 407062 ||  || — || September 21, 2009 || Kitt Peak || Spacewatch || — || align=right | 3.3 km || 
|-id=063 bgcolor=#d6d6d6
| 407063 ||  || — || September 21, 2009 || Kitt Peak || Spacewatch || — || align=right | 3.5 km || 
|-id=064 bgcolor=#d6d6d6
| 407064 ||  || — || September 22, 2009 || Mount Lemmon || Mount Lemmon Survey || — || align=right | 2.8 km || 
|-id=065 bgcolor=#d6d6d6
| 407065 ||  || — || September 23, 2009 || Kitt Peak || Spacewatch || — || align=right | 2.2 km || 
|-id=066 bgcolor=#d6d6d6
| 407066 ||  || — || January 6, 2006 || Anderson Mesa || LONEOS || — || align=right | 4.8 km || 
|-id=067 bgcolor=#E9E9E9
| 407067 ||  || — || August 14, 2004 || Campo Imperatore || CINEOS || — || align=right | 2.6 km || 
|-id=068 bgcolor=#d6d6d6
| 407068 ||  || — || September 18, 2009 || Kitt Peak || Spacewatch || EOS || align=right | 2.1 km || 
|-id=069 bgcolor=#d6d6d6
| 407069 ||  || — || September 21, 2009 || Kitt Peak || Spacewatch || — || align=right | 2.9 km || 
|-id=070 bgcolor=#d6d6d6
| 407070 ||  || — || September 22, 2009 || Kitt Peak || Spacewatch || — || align=right | 2.8 km || 
|-id=071 bgcolor=#d6d6d6
| 407071 ||  || — || March 9, 2007 || Kitt Peak || Spacewatch || — || align=right | 2.3 km || 
|-id=072 bgcolor=#d6d6d6
| 407072 ||  || — || September 12, 2009 || Kitt Peak || Spacewatch || — || align=right | 2.4 km || 
|-id=073 bgcolor=#d6d6d6
| 407073 ||  || — || March 12, 2007 || Kitt Peak || Spacewatch || — || align=right | 3.0 km || 
|-id=074 bgcolor=#d6d6d6
| 407074 ||  || — || September 22, 2009 || Kitt Peak || Spacewatch || — || align=right | 2.6 km || 
|-id=075 bgcolor=#d6d6d6
| 407075 ||  || — || September 22, 2009 || Kitt Peak || Spacewatch || — || align=right | 3.0 km || 
|-id=076 bgcolor=#d6d6d6
| 407076 ||  || — || April 16, 2007 || Mount Lemmon || Mount Lemmon Survey || — || align=right | 2.7 km || 
|-id=077 bgcolor=#d6d6d6
| 407077 ||  || — || September 15, 2009 || Kitt Peak || Spacewatch || — || align=right | 4.1 km || 
|-id=078 bgcolor=#d6d6d6
| 407078 ||  || — || September 23, 2009 || Kitt Peak || Spacewatch || — || align=right | 2.7 km || 
|-id=079 bgcolor=#d6d6d6
| 407079 ||  || — || September 23, 2009 || Kitt Peak || Spacewatch || THM || align=right | 2.0 km || 
|-id=080 bgcolor=#d6d6d6
| 407080 ||  || — || September 24, 2009 || Kitt Peak || Spacewatch || — || align=right | 2.3 km || 
|-id=081 bgcolor=#d6d6d6
| 407081 ||  || — || September 24, 2009 || Kitt Peak || Spacewatch || — || align=right | 2.8 km || 
|-id=082 bgcolor=#d6d6d6
| 407082 ||  || — || September 25, 2009 || Mount Lemmon || Mount Lemmon Survey || — || align=right | 2.8 km || 
|-id=083 bgcolor=#d6d6d6
| 407083 ||  || — || August 15, 2009 || Kitt Peak || Spacewatch || — || align=right | 3.4 km || 
|-id=084 bgcolor=#d6d6d6
| 407084 ||  || — || July 31, 2009 || Catalina || CSS || — || align=right | 2.7 km || 
|-id=085 bgcolor=#d6d6d6
| 407085 ||  || — || September 19, 2009 || Kitt Peak || Spacewatch || — || align=right | 4.0 km || 
|-id=086 bgcolor=#d6d6d6
| 407086 ||  || — || September 23, 2009 || Kitt Peak || Spacewatch || — || align=right | 2.7 km || 
|-id=087 bgcolor=#d6d6d6
| 407087 ||  || — || September 17, 2009 || Kitt Peak || Spacewatch || EOS || align=right | 1.7 km || 
|-id=088 bgcolor=#d6d6d6
| 407088 ||  || — || September 16, 2009 || Siding Spring || SSS || — || align=right | 3.6 km || 
|-id=089 bgcolor=#d6d6d6
| 407089 ||  || — || August 18, 2009 || Kitt Peak || Spacewatch || — || align=right | 3.4 km || 
|-id=090 bgcolor=#d6d6d6
| 407090 ||  || — || September 13, 2004 || Kitt Peak || Spacewatch || KOR || align=right | 1.3 km || 
|-id=091 bgcolor=#d6d6d6
| 407091 ||  || — || September 23, 2009 || Mount Lemmon || Mount Lemmon Survey || — || align=right | 2.9 km || 
|-id=092 bgcolor=#d6d6d6
| 407092 ||  || — || September 24, 2009 || Kitt Peak || Spacewatch || EOS || align=right | 2.2 km || 
|-id=093 bgcolor=#d6d6d6
| 407093 ||  || — || February 21, 2007 || Mount Lemmon || Mount Lemmon Survey || — || align=right | 2.9 km || 
|-id=094 bgcolor=#d6d6d6
| 407094 ||  || — || September 25, 2009 || Kitt Peak || Spacewatch || — || align=right | 2.9 km || 
|-id=095 bgcolor=#d6d6d6
| 407095 ||  || — || September 25, 2009 || Kitt Peak || Spacewatch || EOS || align=right | 2.0 km || 
|-id=096 bgcolor=#d6d6d6
| 407096 ||  || — || September 25, 2009 || Kitt Peak || Spacewatch || — || align=right | 2.8 km || 
|-id=097 bgcolor=#d6d6d6
| 407097 ||  || — || September 17, 2009 || Kitt Peak || Spacewatch || EOS || align=right | 2.0 km || 
|-id=098 bgcolor=#d6d6d6
| 407098 ||  || — || September 25, 2009 || Kitt Peak || Spacewatch || — || align=right | 2.3 km || 
|-id=099 bgcolor=#d6d6d6
| 407099 ||  || — || September 25, 2009 || Kitt Peak || Spacewatch || — || align=right | 2.9 km || 
|-id=100 bgcolor=#d6d6d6
| 407100 ||  || — || September 17, 2009 || Kitt Peak || Spacewatch || — || align=right | 2.3 km || 
|}

407101–407200 

|-bgcolor=#d6d6d6
| 407101 ||  || — || September 25, 2009 || Catalina || CSS || — || align=right | 3.5 km || 
|-id=102 bgcolor=#d6d6d6
| 407102 ||  || — || August 27, 2009 || Kitt Peak || Spacewatch || — || align=right | 2.5 km || 
|-id=103 bgcolor=#d6d6d6
| 407103 ||  || — || September 25, 2009 || Kitt Peak || Spacewatch || EOS || align=right | 2.2 km || 
|-id=104 bgcolor=#d6d6d6
| 407104 ||  || — || September 25, 2009 || Kitt Peak || Spacewatch || — || align=right | 3.1 km || 
|-id=105 bgcolor=#d6d6d6
| 407105 ||  || — || September 25, 2009 || Kitt Peak || Spacewatch || — || align=right | 2.8 km || 
|-id=106 bgcolor=#d6d6d6
| 407106 ||  || — || September 18, 2009 || Kitt Peak || Spacewatch || — || align=right | 2.3 km || 
|-id=107 bgcolor=#d6d6d6
| 407107 ||  || — || September 25, 2009 || Kitt Peak || Spacewatch || — || align=right | 3.0 km || 
|-id=108 bgcolor=#d6d6d6
| 407108 ||  || — || September 26, 2009 || Kitt Peak || Spacewatch || — || align=right | 3.0 km || 
|-id=109 bgcolor=#d6d6d6
| 407109 ||  || — || September 27, 2009 || Catalina || CSS || — || align=right | 3.6 km || 
|-id=110 bgcolor=#d6d6d6
| 407110 ||  || — || September 28, 2009 || Mount Lemmon || Mount Lemmon Survey || EOS || align=right | 1.6 km || 
|-id=111 bgcolor=#d6d6d6
| 407111 ||  || — || September 29, 2009 || Mount Lemmon || Mount Lemmon Survey || LIX || align=right | 5.8 km || 
|-id=112 bgcolor=#d6d6d6
| 407112 ||  || — || September 16, 2009 || Kitt Peak || Spacewatch || — || align=right | 2.2 km || 
|-id=113 bgcolor=#d6d6d6
| 407113 ||  || — || July 31, 2009 || Kitt Peak || Spacewatch || EOS || align=right | 2.8 km || 
|-id=114 bgcolor=#d6d6d6
| 407114 ||  || — || September 17, 2009 || Kitt Peak || Spacewatch || EOS || align=right | 1.9 km || 
|-id=115 bgcolor=#d6d6d6
| 407115 ||  || — || September 17, 2009 || Kitt Peak || Spacewatch || — || align=right | 3.5 km || 
|-id=116 bgcolor=#d6d6d6
| 407116 ||  || — || September 17, 2009 || Mount Lemmon || Mount Lemmon Survey || — || align=right | 2.5 km || 
|-id=117 bgcolor=#d6d6d6
| 407117 ||  || — || August 27, 2009 || Kitt Peak || Spacewatch || HYG || align=right | 2.3 km || 
|-id=118 bgcolor=#d6d6d6
| 407118 ||  || — || August 28, 2009 || Kitt Peak || Spacewatch || — || align=right | 2.6 km || 
|-id=119 bgcolor=#d6d6d6
| 407119 ||  || — || September 20, 2009 || Kitt Peak || Spacewatch || — || align=right | 2.6 km || 
|-id=120 bgcolor=#d6d6d6
| 407120 ||  || — || September 30, 2009 || Mount Lemmon || Mount Lemmon Survey || — || align=right | 3.1 km || 
|-id=121 bgcolor=#d6d6d6
| 407121 ||  || — || September 18, 2009 || Catalina || CSS || — || align=right | 3.9 km || 
|-id=122 bgcolor=#d6d6d6
| 407122 ||  || — || September 28, 2009 || Catalina || CSS || — || align=right | 4.1 km || 
|-id=123 bgcolor=#d6d6d6
| 407123 ||  || — || September 26, 2009 || Kitt Peak || Spacewatch || BRA || align=right | 1.6 km || 
|-id=124 bgcolor=#E9E9E9
| 407124 ||  || — || September 16, 2009 || Catalina || CSS || — || align=right | 3.0 km || 
|-id=125 bgcolor=#d6d6d6
| 407125 ||  || — || September 25, 2009 || Catalina || CSS || EOS || align=right | 2.8 km || 
|-id=126 bgcolor=#d6d6d6
| 407126 ||  || — || September 20, 2009 || Kitt Peak || Spacewatch || — || align=right | 2.4 km || 
|-id=127 bgcolor=#d6d6d6
| 407127 ||  || — || September 20, 2009 || Kitt Peak || Spacewatch || EOS || align=right | 1.7 km || 
|-id=128 bgcolor=#d6d6d6
| 407128 ||  || — || September 16, 2009 || Kitt Peak || Spacewatch || — || align=right | 2.8 km || 
|-id=129 bgcolor=#d6d6d6
| 407129 ||  || — || September 23, 2009 || Mount Lemmon || Mount Lemmon Survey || — || align=right | 4.0 km || 
|-id=130 bgcolor=#d6d6d6
| 407130 ||  || — || September 26, 2009 || Kitt Peak || Spacewatch || — || align=right | 2.5 km || 
|-id=131 bgcolor=#d6d6d6
| 407131 ||  || — || September 18, 2009 || Mount Lemmon || Mount Lemmon Survey || THM || align=right | 1.9 km || 
|-id=132 bgcolor=#d6d6d6
| 407132 ||  || — || September 21, 2009 || Mount Lemmon || Mount Lemmon Survey || — || align=right | 2.7 km || 
|-id=133 bgcolor=#d6d6d6
| 407133 ||  || — || September 21, 2009 || Mount Lemmon || Mount Lemmon Survey || — || align=right | 2.8 km || 
|-id=134 bgcolor=#d6d6d6
| 407134 ||  || — || September 20, 2009 || Mount Lemmon || Mount Lemmon Survey || — || align=right | 2.4 km || 
|-id=135 bgcolor=#d6d6d6
| 407135 ||  || — || September 21, 2009 || Mount Lemmon || Mount Lemmon Survey || — || align=right | 3.1 km || 
|-id=136 bgcolor=#d6d6d6
| 407136 ||  || — || August 17, 2009 || Kitt Peak || Spacewatch || critical || align=right | 2.5 km || 
|-id=137 bgcolor=#d6d6d6
| 407137 ||  || — || September 16, 2009 || Kitt Peak || Spacewatch || — || align=right | 4.3 km || 
|-id=138 bgcolor=#d6d6d6
| 407138 ||  || — || October 13, 2004 || Kitt Peak || Spacewatch || EOS || align=right | 2.0 km || 
|-id=139 bgcolor=#d6d6d6
| 407139 ||  || — || October 11, 2009 || Antares || ARO || — || align=right | 2.2 km || 
|-id=140 bgcolor=#d6d6d6
| 407140 ||  || — || October 2, 2009 || Mount Lemmon || Mount Lemmon Survey || EOS || align=right | 2.3 km || 
|-id=141 bgcolor=#d6d6d6
| 407141 ||  || — || October 12, 2009 || Mount Lemmon || Mount Lemmon Survey || — || align=right | 2.3 km || 
|-id=142 bgcolor=#d6d6d6
| 407142 ||  || — || October 7, 2004 || Anderson Mesa || LONEOS || — || align=right | 3.5 km || 
|-id=143 bgcolor=#d6d6d6
| 407143 ||  || — || October 13, 2009 || Bergisch Gladbac || W. Bickel || — || align=right | 4.1 km || 
|-id=144 bgcolor=#E9E9E9
| 407144 ||  || — || September 27, 2009 || Mount Lemmon || Mount Lemmon Survey || GEF || align=right | 1.6 km || 
|-id=145 bgcolor=#d6d6d6
| 407145 ||  || — || September 16, 2009 || Kitt Peak || Spacewatch || VER || align=right | 2.3 km || 
|-id=146 bgcolor=#d6d6d6
| 407146 ||  || — || September 22, 2009 || Mount Lemmon || Mount Lemmon Survey || — || align=right | 3.3 km || 
|-id=147 bgcolor=#d6d6d6
| 407147 ||  || — || October 11, 2009 || La Sagra || OAM Obs. || — || align=right | 2.5 km || 
|-id=148 bgcolor=#d6d6d6
| 407148 ||  || — || September 16, 2009 || Mount Lemmon || Mount Lemmon Survey || — || align=right | 2.4 km || 
|-id=149 bgcolor=#d6d6d6
| 407149 ||  || — || October 14, 2009 || Catalina || CSS || — || align=right | 3.9 km || 
|-id=150 bgcolor=#d6d6d6
| 407150 ||  || — || October 2, 2009 || Mount Lemmon || Mount Lemmon Survey || — || align=right | 2.2 km || 
|-id=151 bgcolor=#d6d6d6
| 407151 ||  || — || October 15, 2009 || Catalina || CSS || — || align=right | 3.3 km || 
|-id=152 bgcolor=#d6d6d6
| 407152 ||  || — || September 29, 2009 || Mount Lemmon || Mount Lemmon Survey || — || align=right | 4.3 km || 
|-id=153 bgcolor=#d6d6d6
| 407153 ||  || — || October 15, 2009 || Catalina || CSS || — || align=right | 3.4 km || 
|-id=154 bgcolor=#d6d6d6
| 407154 ||  || — || October 18, 2009 || Tzec Maun || D. Chestnov, A. Novichonok || — || align=right | 3.5 km || 
|-id=155 bgcolor=#d6d6d6
| 407155 ||  || — || September 28, 2009 || Mount Lemmon || Mount Lemmon Survey || — || align=right | 2.8 km || 
|-id=156 bgcolor=#d6d6d6
| 407156 ||  || — || October 16, 2009 || Mount Lemmon || Mount Lemmon Survey || THM || align=right | 1.9 km || 
|-id=157 bgcolor=#d6d6d6
| 407157 ||  || — || October 16, 2009 || Mount Lemmon || Mount Lemmon Survey || THM || align=right | 1.9 km || 
|-id=158 bgcolor=#d6d6d6
| 407158 ||  || — || October 16, 2009 || Mount Lemmon || Mount Lemmon Survey || — || align=right | 2.3 km || 
|-id=159 bgcolor=#d6d6d6
| 407159 ||  || — || October 19, 2009 || Taunus || S. Karge, R. Kling || — || align=right | 2.4 km || 
|-id=160 bgcolor=#d6d6d6
| 407160 ||  || — || April 14, 2007 || Mount Lemmon || Mount Lemmon Survey || — || align=right | 4.2 km || 
|-id=161 bgcolor=#d6d6d6
| 407161 ||  || — || October 18, 2009 || Mount Lemmon || Mount Lemmon Survey || — || align=right | 2.6 km || 
|-id=162 bgcolor=#d6d6d6
| 407162 ||  || — || October 21, 2009 || Catalina || CSS || — || align=right | 4.4 km || 
|-id=163 bgcolor=#d6d6d6
| 407163 ||  || — || October 21, 2009 || Catalina || CSS || TIR || align=right | 2.9 km || 
|-id=164 bgcolor=#d6d6d6
| 407164 ||  || — || October 18, 2009 || Mount Lemmon || Mount Lemmon Survey || — || align=right | 2.5 km || 
|-id=165 bgcolor=#d6d6d6
| 407165 ||  || — || October 18, 2009 || Mount Lemmon || Mount Lemmon Survey || THB || align=right | 2.9 km || 
|-id=166 bgcolor=#d6d6d6
| 407166 ||  || — || September 27, 2009 || Mount Lemmon || Mount Lemmon Survey || — || align=right | 3.5 km || 
|-id=167 bgcolor=#d6d6d6
| 407167 ||  || — || October 11, 2009 || Mount Lemmon || Mount Lemmon Survey || — || align=right | 3.4 km || 
|-id=168 bgcolor=#d6d6d6
| 407168 ||  || — || October 22, 2009 || Mount Lemmon || Mount Lemmon Survey || — || align=right | 4.0 km || 
|-id=169 bgcolor=#d6d6d6
| 407169 ||  || — || October 20, 1998 || Kitt Peak || Spacewatch || — || align=right | 2.9 km || 
|-id=170 bgcolor=#d6d6d6
| 407170 ||  || — || October 18, 2009 || Mount Lemmon || Mount Lemmon Survey || — || align=right | 3.3 km || 
|-id=171 bgcolor=#d6d6d6
| 407171 ||  || — || October 22, 2009 || Mount Lemmon || Mount Lemmon Survey || THM || align=right | 3.0 km || 
|-id=172 bgcolor=#d6d6d6
| 407172 ||  || — || September 21, 2009 || Mount Lemmon || Mount Lemmon Survey || — || align=right | 2.1 km || 
|-id=173 bgcolor=#d6d6d6
| 407173 ||  || — || September 21, 2009 || Mount Lemmon || Mount Lemmon Survey || VER || align=right | 4.2 km || 
|-id=174 bgcolor=#d6d6d6
| 407174 ||  || — || September 27, 2009 || Mount Lemmon || Mount Lemmon Survey || — || align=right | 3.9 km || 
|-id=175 bgcolor=#d6d6d6
| 407175 ||  || — || October 17, 2009 || Mount Lemmon || Mount Lemmon Survey || EOS || align=right | 1.7 km || 
|-id=176 bgcolor=#d6d6d6
| 407176 ||  || — || October 17, 2009 || Mount Lemmon || Mount Lemmon Survey || — || align=right | 2.9 km || 
|-id=177 bgcolor=#d6d6d6
| 407177 ||  || — || September 21, 2009 || Kitt Peak || Spacewatch || — || align=right | 2.7 km || 
|-id=178 bgcolor=#d6d6d6
| 407178 ||  || — || September 17, 2009 || Kitt Peak || Spacewatch || — || align=right | 2.7 km || 
|-id=179 bgcolor=#d6d6d6
| 407179 ||  || — || September 29, 2009 || Kitt Peak || Spacewatch || — || align=right | 3.3 km || 
|-id=180 bgcolor=#d6d6d6
| 407180 ||  || — || January 23, 2006 || Mount Lemmon || Mount Lemmon Survey || — || align=right | 2.5 km || 
|-id=181 bgcolor=#d6d6d6
| 407181 ||  || — || October 22, 2009 || Mount Lemmon || Mount Lemmon Survey || URS || align=right | 3.1 km || 
|-id=182 bgcolor=#d6d6d6
| 407182 ||  || — || October 23, 2009 || Mount Lemmon || Mount Lemmon Survey || THM || align=right | 2.2 km || 
|-id=183 bgcolor=#d6d6d6
| 407183 ||  || — || June 6, 2008 || Kitt Peak || Spacewatch || — || align=right | 3.0 km || 
|-id=184 bgcolor=#d6d6d6
| 407184 ||  || — || October 24, 2009 || Catalina || CSS || — || align=right | 2.6 km || 
|-id=185 bgcolor=#d6d6d6
| 407185 ||  || — || October 24, 2009 || Kitt Peak || Spacewatch || — || align=right | 2.8 km || 
|-id=186 bgcolor=#d6d6d6
| 407186 ||  || — || October 21, 2009 || Catalina || CSS || — || align=right | 2.3 km || 
|-id=187 bgcolor=#d6d6d6
| 407187 ||  || — || September 17, 2009 || Mount Lemmon || Mount Lemmon Survey || — || align=right | 3.4 km || 
|-id=188 bgcolor=#d6d6d6
| 407188 ||  || — || October 14, 2009 || Catalina || CSS || THM || align=right | 3.1 km || 
|-id=189 bgcolor=#d6d6d6
| 407189 ||  || — || October 23, 2009 || Mount Lemmon || Mount Lemmon Survey || — || align=right | 2.3 km || 
|-id=190 bgcolor=#d6d6d6
| 407190 ||  || — || September 12, 2009 || Kitt Peak || Spacewatch || — || align=right | 3.8 km || 
|-id=191 bgcolor=#d6d6d6
| 407191 ||  || — || October 22, 2009 || Mount Lemmon || Mount Lemmon Survey || EOS || align=right | 3.0 km || 
|-id=192 bgcolor=#d6d6d6
| 407192 ||  || — || October 22, 2009 || Mount Lemmon || Mount Lemmon Survey || — || align=right | 2.7 km || 
|-id=193 bgcolor=#d6d6d6
| 407193 ||  || — || October 23, 2009 || Mount Lemmon || Mount Lemmon Survey || — || align=right | 2.7 km || 
|-id=194 bgcolor=#d6d6d6
| 407194 ||  || — || September 18, 2009 || Kitt Peak || Spacewatch || URS || align=right | 2.9 km || 
|-id=195 bgcolor=#d6d6d6
| 407195 ||  || — || October 24, 2009 || Kitt Peak || Spacewatch || — || align=right | 4.5 km || 
|-id=196 bgcolor=#d6d6d6
| 407196 ||  || — || October 26, 2009 || Mount Lemmon || Mount Lemmon Survey || — || align=right | 3.2 km || 
|-id=197 bgcolor=#d6d6d6
| 407197 ||  || — || October 27, 2009 || La Sagra || OAM Obs. || LIX || align=right | 4.4 km || 
|-id=198 bgcolor=#d6d6d6
| 407198 ||  || — || September 28, 2009 || Catalina || CSS || EOS || align=right | 2.8 km || 
|-id=199 bgcolor=#d6d6d6
| 407199 ||  || — || October 25, 2009 || Catalina || CSS || — || align=right | 3.1 km || 
|-id=200 bgcolor=#d6d6d6
| 407200 ||  || — || October 28, 2009 || La Sagra || OAM Obs. || — || align=right | 4.3 km || 
|}

407201–407300 

|-bgcolor=#d6d6d6
| 407201 ||  || — || October 18, 2009 || Mount Lemmon || Mount Lemmon Survey || — || align=right | 2.2 km || 
|-id=202 bgcolor=#d6d6d6
| 407202 ||  || — || October 16, 2003 || Kitt Peak || Spacewatch || — || align=right | 2.5 km || 
|-id=203 bgcolor=#d6d6d6
| 407203 ||  || — || October 26, 2009 || Mount Lemmon || Mount Lemmon Survey || EOS || align=right | 2.1 km || 
|-id=204 bgcolor=#d6d6d6
| 407204 ||  || — || October 18, 2009 || Mount Lemmon || Mount Lemmon Survey || THM || align=right | 1.9 km || 
|-id=205 bgcolor=#d6d6d6
| 407205 ||  || — || October 23, 2009 || Kitt Peak || Spacewatch || — || align=right | 3.0 km || 
|-id=206 bgcolor=#d6d6d6
| 407206 ||  || — || October 24, 2009 || Mount Lemmon || Mount Lemmon Survey || HYG || align=right | 3.0 km || 
|-id=207 bgcolor=#d6d6d6
| 407207 ||  || — || October 22, 2009 || Bisei SG Center || BATTeRS || — || align=right | 3.9 km || 
|-id=208 bgcolor=#d6d6d6
| 407208 ||  || — || November 9, 2009 || Calvin-Rehoboth || L. A. Molnar || THM || align=right | 2.3 km || 
|-id=209 bgcolor=#d6d6d6
| 407209 ||  || — || November 9, 2009 || Socorro || LINEAR || — || align=right | 1.8 km || 
|-id=210 bgcolor=#d6d6d6
| 407210 ||  || — || November 9, 2009 || Socorro || LINEAR || — || align=right | 4.2 km || 
|-id=211 bgcolor=#d6d6d6
| 407211 ||  || — || November 8, 2009 || Catalina || CSS || EUP || align=right | 4.8 km || 
|-id=212 bgcolor=#d6d6d6
| 407212 ||  || — || November 8, 2009 || Mount Lemmon || Mount Lemmon Survey || — || align=right | 2.5 km || 
|-id=213 bgcolor=#d6d6d6
| 407213 ||  || — || November 9, 2009 || Kitt Peak || Spacewatch || — || align=right | 3.1 km || 
|-id=214 bgcolor=#d6d6d6
| 407214 ||  || — || November 11, 2009 || Kitt Peak || Spacewatch || — || align=right | 3.2 km || 
|-id=215 bgcolor=#d6d6d6
| 407215 ||  || — || October 21, 2009 || Catalina || CSS || — || align=right | 3.4 km || 
|-id=216 bgcolor=#d6d6d6
| 407216 ||  || — || November 8, 2009 || Kitt Peak || Spacewatch || — || align=right | 3.4 km || 
|-id=217 bgcolor=#d6d6d6
| 407217 ||  || — || March 25, 2006 || Kitt Peak || Spacewatch || — || align=right | 2.5 km || 
|-id=218 bgcolor=#d6d6d6
| 407218 ||  || — || November 11, 2009 || Mount Lemmon || Mount Lemmon Survey || — || align=right | 2.5 km || 
|-id=219 bgcolor=#d6d6d6
| 407219 ||  || — || November 11, 2009 || Mount Lemmon || Mount Lemmon Survey || — || align=right | 5.2 km || 
|-id=220 bgcolor=#d6d6d6
| 407220 ||  || — || November 9, 2009 || Catalina || CSS || — || align=right | 3.7 km || 
|-id=221 bgcolor=#d6d6d6
| 407221 ||  || — || November 10, 2009 || Kitt Peak || Spacewatch || — || align=right | 3.4 km || 
|-id=222 bgcolor=#d6d6d6
| 407222 ||  || — || January 15, 2005 || Kitt Peak || Spacewatch || HYG || align=right | 2.5 km || 
|-id=223 bgcolor=#d6d6d6
| 407223 ||  || — || November 15, 2009 || Catalina || CSS || EOS || align=right | 1.9 km || 
|-id=224 bgcolor=#d6d6d6
| 407224 ||  || — || November 8, 2009 || Catalina || CSS || — || align=right | 3.2 km || 
|-id=225 bgcolor=#d6d6d6
| 407225 ||  || — || October 22, 2009 || Mount Lemmon || Mount Lemmon Survey || ELF || align=right | 3.7 km || 
|-id=226 bgcolor=#d6d6d6
| 407226 ||  || — || November 9, 2009 || Catalina || CSS || — || align=right | 2.6 km || 
|-id=227 bgcolor=#d6d6d6
| 407227 ||  || — || January 18, 2005 || Kitt Peak || Spacewatch || — || align=right | 2.0 km || 
|-id=228 bgcolor=#d6d6d6
| 407228 ||  || — || November 20, 2009 || Tzec Maun || D. Chestnov, A. Novichonok || HYG || align=right | 3.9 km || 
|-id=229 bgcolor=#d6d6d6
| 407229 ||  || — || November 17, 2009 || Mount Lemmon || Mount Lemmon Survey || — || align=right | 3.8 km || 
|-id=230 bgcolor=#d6d6d6
| 407230 ||  || — || November 21, 2009 || Mayhill || A. Lowe || — || align=right | 4.1 km || 
|-id=231 bgcolor=#d6d6d6
| 407231 ||  || — || November 21, 2009 || Tzec Maun || D. Chestnov, A. Novichonok || — || align=right | 2.4 km || 
|-id=232 bgcolor=#d6d6d6
| 407232 ||  || — || November 17, 2009 || Kitt Peak || Spacewatch || — || align=right | 3.1 km || 
|-id=233 bgcolor=#d6d6d6
| 407233 ||  || — || November 17, 2009 || Mount Lemmon || Mount Lemmon Survey || SYL7:4 || align=right | 5.2 km || 
|-id=234 bgcolor=#d6d6d6
| 407234 ||  || — || November 9, 2009 || Kitt Peak || Spacewatch || — || align=right | 5.3 km || 
|-id=235 bgcolor=#d6d6d6
| 407235 ||  || — || November 16, 2009 || Socorro || LINEAR || — || align=right | 2.4 km || 
|-id=236 bgcolor=#d6d6d6
| 407236 ||  || — || November 18, 2009 || Kitt Peak || Spacewatch || EOS || align=right | 2.3 km || 
|-id=237 bgcolor=#d6d6d6
| 407237 ||  || — || November 18, 2009 || La Sagra || OAM Obs. || — || align=right | 2.5 km || 
|-id=238 bgcolor=#d6d6d6
| 407238 ||  || — || September 28, 2003 || Kitt Peak || Spacewatch || — || align=right | 3.3 km || 
|-id=239 bgcolor=#d6d6d6
| 407239 ||  || — || November 20, 2009 || Mount Lemmon || Mount Lemmon Survey || THM || align=right | 2.9 km || 
|-id=240 bgcolor=#d6d6d6
| 407240 ||  || — || November 21, 2009 || Kitt Peak || Spacewatch || — || align=right | 3.4 km || 
|-id=241 bgcolor=#d6d6d6
| 407241 ||  || — || October 18, 2009 || Mount Lemmon || Mount Lemmon Survey || VER || align=right | 2.6 km || 
|-id=242 bgcolor=#d6d6d6
| 407242 ||  || — || November 21, 2009 || Kitt Peak || Spacewatch || — || align=right | 4.5 km || 
|-id=243 bgcolor=#d6d6d6
| 407243 Krapivin ||  ||  || November 21, 2009 || Zelenchukskaya S || T. V. Kryachko || THM || align=right | 1.9 km || 
|-id=244 bgcolor=#d6d6d6
| 407244 ||  || — || November 20, 2009 || La Sagra || OAM Obs. || — || align=right | 3.2 km || 
|-id=245 bgcolor=#d6d6d6
| 407245 ||  || — || November 20, 2009 || Mount Lemmon || Mount Lemmon Survey || — || align=right | 3.9 km || 
|-id=246 bgcolor=#d6d6d6
| 407246 ||  || — || November 21, 2009 || Kitt Peak || Spacewatch || — || align=right | 2.3 km || 
|-id=247 bgcolor=#d6d6d6
| 407247 ||  || — || November 9, 2009 || Mount Lemmon || Mount Lemmon Survey || — || align=right | 2.7 km || 
|-id=248 bgcolor=#d6d6d6
| 407248 ||  || — || November 24, 2009 || La Sagra || OAM Obs. || — || align=right | 3.2 km || 
|-id=249 bgcolor=#d6d6d6
| 407249 ||  || — || September 16, 2003 || Kitt Peak || Spacewatch || THM || align=right | 2.0 km || 
|-id=250 bgcolor=#d6d6d6
| 407250 ||  || — || January 19, 2005 || Kitt Peak || Spacewatch || — || align=right | 2.9 km || 
|-id=251 bgcolor=#d6d6d6
| 407251 ||  || — || October 23, 2009 || Kitt Peak || Spacewatch || 7:4 || align=right | 3.4 km || 
|-id=252 bgcolor=#d6d6d6
| 407252 ||  || — || November 16, 2009 || Mount Lemmon || Mount Lemmon Survey || — || align=right | 3.5 km || 
|-id=253 bgcolor=#d6d6d6
| 407253 ||  || — || September 14, 2009 || Kitt Peak || Spacewatch || EOS || align=right | 2.0 km || 
|-id=254 bgcolor=#d6d6d6
| 407254 ||  || — || November 16, 2009 || Socorro || LINEAR || — || align=right | 4.0 km || 
|-id=255 bgcolor=#fefefe
| 407255 ||  || — || November 1, 2006 || Catalina || CSS || H || align=right data-sort-value="0.68" | 680 m || 
|-id=256 bgcolor=#d6d6d6
| 407256 ||  || — || January 13, 2010 || Mount Lemmon || Mount Lemmon Survey || EUP || align=right | 5.7 km || 
|-id=257 bgcolor=#d6d6d6
| 407257 ||  || — || September 29, 2009 || Mount Lemmon || Mount Lemmon Survey || — || align=right | 3.8 km || 
|-id=258 bgcolor=#d6d6d6
| 407258 ||  || — || October 2, 2009 || Mount Lemmon || Mount Lemmon Survey || EUP || align=right | 2.8 km || 
|-id=259 bgcolor=#d6d6d6
| 407259 ||  || — || October 1, 2009 || Mount Lemmon || Mount Lemmon Survey || — || align=right | 3.5 km || 
|-id=260 bgcolor=#d6d6d6
| 407260 ||  || — || January 18, 2010 || Dauban || F. Kugel || SYL7:4 || align=right | 5.2 km || 
|-id=261 bgcolor=#fefefe
| 407261 ||  || — || January 21, 2010 || Haleakala || M. Micheli || — || align=right data-sort-value="0.71" | 710 m || 
|-id=262 bgcolor=#d6d6d6
| 407262 ||  || — || January 14, 2010 || Mount Lemmon || Mount Lemmon Survey || TIR || align=right | 5.2 km || 
|-id=263 bgcolor=#d6d6d6
| 407263 ||  || — || August 26, 2009 || Catalina || CSS || — || align=right | 4.4 km || 
|-id=264 bgcolor=#fefefe
| 407264 ||  || — || May 9, 2007 || Mount Lemmon || Mount Lemmon Survey || — || align=right | 2.2 km || 
|-id=265 bgcolor=#fefefe
| 407265 ||  || — || March 14, 2007 || Mount Lemmon || Mount Lemmon Survey || — || align=right data-sort-value="0.57" | 570 m || 
|-id=266 bgcolor=#fefefe
| 407266 ||  || — || February 9, 2010 || Kitt Peak || Spacewatch || — || align=right data-sort-value="0.82" | 820 m || 
|-id=267 bgcolor=#d6d6d6
| 407267 ||  || — || February 14, 2010 || WISE || WISE || — || align=right | 3.7 km || 
|-id=268 bgcolor=#d6d6d6
| 407268 ||  || — || February 9, 2010 || Catalina || CSS || — || align=right | 3.1 km || 
|-id=269 bgcolor=#d6d6d6
| 407269 ||  || — || December 18, 2003 || Socorro || LINEAR || — || align=right | 4.0 km || 
|-id=270 bgcolor=#d6d6d6
| 407270 ||  || — || February 13, 2010 || Catalina || CSS || — || align=right | 3.4 km || 
|-id=271 bgcolor=#d6d6d6
| 407271 ||  || — || September 29, 2009 || Mount Lemmon || Mount Lemmon Survey || — || align=right | 4.9 km || 
|-id=272 bgcolor=#fefefe
| 407272 ||  || — || February 20, 2010 || WISE || WISE || — || align=right | 1.4 km || 
|-id=273 bgcolor=#d6d6d6
| 407273 ||  || — || February 28, 2010 || WISE || WISE || — || align=right | 3.1 km || 
|-id=274 bgcolor=#fefefe
| 407274 ||  || — || March 12, 2010 || Mount Lemmon || Mount Lemmon Survey || — || align=right data-sort-value="0.60" | 600 m || 
|-id=275 bgcolor=#fefefe
| 407275 ||  || — || March 17, 2010 || Kitt Peak || Spacewatch || — || align=right data-sort-value="0.77" | 770 m || 
|-id=276 bgcolor=#fefefe
| 407276 ||  || — || March 17, 2010 || Kitt Peak || Spacewatch || — || align=right | 1.4 km || 
|-id=277 bgcolor=#fefefe
| 407277 ||  || — || March 25, 2010 || Mount Lemmon || Mount Lemmon Survey || NYS || align=right data-sort-value="0.72" | 720 m || 
|-id=278 bgcolor=#fefefe
| 407278 ||  || — || May 26, 2007 || Mount Lemmon || Mount Lemmon Survey || — || align=right data-sort-value="0.63" | 630 m || 
|-id=279 bgcolor=#fefefe
| 407279 ||  || — || March 21, 2010 || Kitt Peak || Spacewatch || — || align=right | 1.2 km || 
|-id=280 bgcolor=#fefefe
| 407280 ||  || — || March 19, 2010 || Kitt Peak || Spacewatch || — || align=right data-sort-value="0.71" | 710 m || 
|-id=281 bgcolor=#fefefe
| 407281 ||  || — || February 18, 2010 || Mount Lemmon || Mount Lemmon Survey || NYS || align=right data-sort-value="0.62" | 620 m || 
|-id=282 bgcolor=#fefefe
| 407282 ||  || — || March 16, 2010 || Kitt Peak || Spacewatch || — || align=right data-sort-value="0.69" | 690 m || 
|-id=283 bgcolor=#fefefe
| 407283 ||  || — || October 7, 2004 || Kitt Peak || Spacewatch || — || align=right data-sort-value="0.67" | 670 m || 
|-id=284 bgcolor=#fefefe
| 407284 ||  || — || April 4, 2010 || Kitt Peak || Spacewatch || — || align=right data-sort-value="0.77" | 770 m || 
|-id=285 bgcolor=#fefefe
| 407285 ||  || — || March 13, 2010 || Mount Lemmon || Mount Lemmon Survey || — || align=right data-sort-value="0.63" | 630 m || 
|-id=286 bgcolor=#FA8072
| 407286 ||  || — || October 20, 2007 || Kitt Peak || Spacewatch || — || align=right data-sort-value="0.78" | 780 m || 
|-id=287 bgcolor=#fefefe
| 407287 ||  || — || April 9, 2010 || Kitt Peak || Spacewatch || — || align=right data-sort-value="0.91" | 910 m || 
|-id=288 bgcolor=#fefefe
| 407288 ||  || — || April 15, 2010 || Kitt Peak || Spacewatch || — || align=right | 1.8 km || 
|-id=289 bgcolor=#fefefe
| 407289 ||  || — || April 26, 2010 || WISE || WISE || — || align=right | 2.4 km || 
|-id=290 bgcolor=#fefefe
| 407290 ||  || — || April 27, 2010 || WISE || WISE || (2076) || align=right | 1.3 km || 
|-id=291 bgcolor=#fefefe
| 407291 ||  || — || April 9, 2010 || Kitt Peak || Spacewatch || — || align=right data-sort-value="0.97" | 970 m || 
|-id=292 bgcolor=#fefefe
| 407292 ||  || — || May 2, 2010 || Kitt Peak || Spacewatch || — || align=right data-sort-value="0.87" | 870 m || 
|-id=293 bgcolor=#fefefe
| 407293 ||  || — || September 11, 2007 || Kitt Peak || Spacewatch || — || align=right data-sort-value="0.78" | 780 m || 
|-id=294 bgcolor=#fefefe
| 407294 ||  || — || June 23, 2007 || Kitt Peak || Spacewatch || — || align=right data-sort-value="0.85" | 850 m || 
|-id=295 bgcolor=#E9E9E9
| 407295 ||  || — || May 12, 2010 || WISE || WISE || — || align=right | 3.1 km || 
|-id=296 bgcolor=#fefefe
| 407296 ||  || — || March 13, 2010 || Mount Lemmon || Mount Lemmon Survey || NYS || align=right data-sort-value="0.60" | 600 m || 
|-id=297 bgcolor=#fefefe
| 407297 ||  || — || May 11, 2010 || Kitt Peak || Spacewatch || — || align=right data-sort-value="0.94" | 940 m || 
|-id=298 bgcolor=#fefefe
| 407298 ||  || — || May 6, 2010 || Mount Lemmon || Mount Lemmon Survey || — || align=right | 1.6 km || 
|-id=299 bgcolor=#fefefe
| 407299 ||  || — || July 29, 2006 || Siding Spring || SSS || — || align=right | 2.3 km || 
|-id=300 bgcolor=#E9E9E9
| 407300 ||  || — || June 9, 2010 || WISE || WISE || BRG || align=right | 1.4 km || 
|}

407301–407400 

|-bgcolor=#E9E9E9
| 407301 ||  || — || April 25, 2006 || Mount Lemmon || Mount Lemmon Survey || — || align=right data-sort-value="0.98" | 980 m || 
|-id=302 bgcolor=#fefefe
| 407302 ||  || — || January 23, 2006 || Kitt Peak || Spacewatch || V || align=right data-sort-value="0.54" | 540 m || 
|-id=303 bgcolor=#E9E9E9
| 407303 ||  || — || June 12, 2010 || WISE || WISE || — || align=right | 1.4 km || 
|-id=304 bgcolor=#E9E9E9
| 407304 ||  || — || June 15, 2010 || WISE || WISE || ADE || align=right | 2.1 km || 
|-id=305 bgcolor=#E9E9E9
| 407305 ||  || — || June 15, 2010 || WISE || WISE || — || align=right | 1.7 km || 
|-id=306 bgcolor=#fefefe
| 407306 ||  || — || June 16, 2010 || WISE || WISE || — || align=right | 2.3 km || 
|-id=307 bgcolor=#E9E9E9
| 407307 ||  || — || October 28, 2006 || Mount Lemmon || Mount Lemmon Survey || — || align=right | 1.8 km || 
|-id=308 bgcolor=#E9E9E9
| 407308 ||  || — || June 30, 2010 || WISE || WISE || — || align=right | 1.5 km || 
|-id=309 bgcolor=#E9E9E9
| 407309 ||  || — || January 10, 2003 || Socorro || LINEAR || — || align=right | 2.4 km || 
|-id=310 bgcolor=#E9E9E9
| 407310 ||  || — || July 6, 2010 || WISE || WISE || ADE || align=right | 2.6 km || 
|-id=311 bgcolor=#E9E9E9
| 407311 ||  || — || January 15, 2008 || Mount Lemmon || Mount Lemmon Survey || — || align=right | 2.8 km || 
|-id=312 bgcolor=#E9E9E9
| 407312 ||  || — || July 10, 2010 || WISE || WISE || — || align=right | 2.9 km || 
|-id=313 bgcolor=#E9E9E9
| 407313 ||  || — || July 10, 2010 || WISE || WISE || — || align=right | 1.4 km || 
|-id=314 bgcolor=#E9E9E9
| 407314 ||  || — || October 2, 2006 || Mount Lemmon || Mount Lemmon Survey || — || align=right | 1.8 km || 
|-id=315 bgcolor=#E9E9E9
| 407315 ||  || — || July 14, 2010 || WISE || WISE || — || align=right | 1.9 km || 
|-id=316 bgcolor=#E9E9E9
| 407316 ||  || — || July 16, 2010 || WISE || WISE || — || align=right | 1.7 km || 
|-id=317 bgcolor=#E9E9E9
| 407317 ||  || — || July 19, 2010 || WISE || WISE || PAD || align=right | 2.8 km || 
|-id=318 bgcolor=#E9E9E9
| 407318 ||  || — || December 15, 2006 || Mount Lemmon || Mount Lemmon Survey || — || align=right | 3.0 km || 
|-id=319 bgcolor=#E9E9E9
| 407319 ||  || — || July 25, 2010 || WISE || WISE || DOR || align=right | 2.0 km || 
|-id=320 bgcolor=#E9E9E9
| 407320 ||  || — || August 29, 2005 || Kitt Peak || Spacewatch || — || align=right | 2.0 km || 
|-id=321 bgcolor=#E9E9E9
| 407321 ||  || — || January 5, 2003 || Socorro || LINEAR || — || align=right | 2.9 km || 
|-id=322 bgcolor=#E9E9E9
| 407322 ||  || — || August 28, 2005 || Kitt Peak || Spacewatch || — || align=right | 2.1 km || 
|-id=323 bgcolor=#E9E9E9
| 407323 ||  || — || July 28, 2010 || WISE || WISE || — || align=right | 2.1 km || 
|-id=324 bgcolor=#FFC2E0
| 407324 ||  || — || July 18, 2010 || WISE || WISE || APOcritical || align=right data-sort-value="0.28" | 280 m || 
|-id=325 bgcolor=#E9E9E9
| 407325 ||  || — || July 31, 2010 || WISE || WISE || — || align=right | 2.7 km || 
|-id=326 bgcolor=#E9E9E9
| 407326 ||  || — || August 8, 2010 || WISE || WISE || DOR || align=right | 1.9 km || 
|-id=327 bgcolor=#E9E9E9
| 407327 ||  || — || August 8, 2010 || WISE || WISE || — || align=right | 2.3 km || 
|-id=328 bgcolor=#E9E9E9
| 407328 ||  || — || August 6, 2010 || La Sagra || OAM Obs. || — || align=right | 1.0 km || 
|-id=329 bgcolor=#fefefe
| 407329 ||  || — || August 10, 2010 || Kitt Peak || Spacewatch || MAS || align=right data-sort-value="0.76" | 760 m || 
|-id=330 bgcolor=#fefefe
| 407330 ||  || — || August 3, 2010 || Purple Mountain || PMO NEO || — || align=right data-sort-value="0.88" | 880 m || 
|-id=331 bgcolor=#fefefe
| 407331 ||  || — || August 10, 2010 || Kitt Peak || Spacewatch || — || align=right | 1.3 km || 
|-id=332 bgcolor=#fefefe
| 407332 ||  || — || August 12, 2010 || Kitt Peak || Spacewatch || — || align=right data-sort-value="0.81" | 810 m || 
|-id=333 bgcolor=#E9E9E9
| 407333 ||  || — || August 10, 2010 || Kitt Peak || Spacewatch || — || align=right | 1.6 km || 
|-id=334 bgcolor=#E9E9E9
| 407334 ||  || — || August 16, 2010 || La Sagra || OAM Obs. || — || align=right data-sort-value="0.80" | 800 m || 
|-id=335 bgcolor=#E9E9E9
| 407335 ||  || — || September 16, 2006 || Catalina || CSS || — || align=right | 1.6 km || 
|-id=336 bgcolor=#E9E9E9
| 407336 ||  || — || September 2, 2010 || Mount Lemmon || Mount Lemmon Survey || — || align=right | 1.8 km || 
|-id=337 bgcolor=#fefefe
| 407337 ||  || — || January 1, 2008 || Kitt Peak || Spacewatch || — || align=right data-sort-value="0.77" | 770 m || 
|-id=338 bgcolor=#FFC2E0
| 407338 ||  || — || September 3, 2010 || Mount Lemmon || Mount Lemmon Survey || APO +1km || align=right data-sort-value="0.82" | 820 m || 
|-id=339 bgcolor=#E9E9E9
| 407339 ||  || — || September 25, 2006 || Catalina || CSS || — || align=right | 2.0 km || 
|-id=340 bgcolor=#E9E9E9
| 407340 ||  || — || September 4, 2010 || Kitt Peak || Spacewatch || — || align=right | 1.4 km || 
|-id=341 bgcolor=#E9E9E9
| 407341 ||  || — || September 4, 2010 || Kitt Peak || Spacewatch || — || align=right | 1.6 km || 
|-id=342 bgcolor=#fefefe
| 407342 ||  || — || September 4, 2010 || Kitt Peak || Spacewatch || — || align=right data-sort-value="0.80" | 800 m || 
|-id=343 bgcolor=#E9E9E9
| 407343 ||  || — || September 4, 2010 || Kitt Peak || Spacewatch || — || align=right | 1.3 km || 
|-id=344 bgcolor=#E9E9E9
| 407344 ||  || — || September 17, 2006 || Catalina || CSS || — || align=right data-sort-value="0.79" | 790 m || 
|-id=345 bgcolor=#E9E9E9
| 407345 ||  || — || October 3, 2006 || Catalina || CSS || MAR || align=right | 1.6 km || 
|-id=346 bgcolor=#E9E9E9
| 407346 ||  || — || November 17, 2006 || Kitt Peak || Spacewatch || — || align=right | 1.7 km || 
|-id=347 bgcolor=#E9E9E9
| 407347 ||  || — || September 11, 2010 || Kitt Peak || Spacewatch || (5) || align=right data-sort-value="0.85" | 850 m || 
|-id=348 bgcolor=#E9E9E9
| 407348 ||  || — || April 3, 2008 || Mount Lemmon || Mount Lemmon Survey || — || align=right | 1.5 km || 
|-id=349 bgcolor=#fefefe
| 407349 ||  || — || September 11, 2010 || Wildberg || R. Apitzsch || — || align=right data-sort-value="0.76" | 760 m || 
|-id=350 bgcolor=#E9E9E9
| 407350 ||  || — || August 6, 2010 || Kitt Peak || Spacewatch || — || align=right | 1.6 km || 
|-id=351 bgcolor=#E9E9E9
| 407351 ||  || — || September 10, 2010 || Kitt Peak || Spacewatch || AGN || align=right | 1.2 km || 
|-id=352 bgcolor=#E9E9E9
| 407352 ||  || — || October 13, 2006 || Kitt Peak || Spacewatch || (5) || align=right data-sort-value="0.70" | 700 m || 
|-id=353 bgcolor=#E9E9E9
| 407353 ||  || — || February 26, 2008 || Mount Lemmon || Mount Lemmon Survey || — || align=right | 1.5 km || 
|-id=354 bgcolor=#E9E9E9
| 407354 ||  || — || September 10, 2010 || Kitt Peak || Spacewatch || — || align=right | 1.3 km || 
|-id=355 bgcolor=#E9E9E9
| 407355 ||  || — || September 10, 2010 || Kitt Peak || Spacewatch || NEM || align=right | 1.6 km || 
|-id=356 bgcolor=#E9E9E9
| 407356 ||  || — || September 10, 2010 || Kitt Peak || Spacewatch || — || align=right | 2.6 km || 
|-id=357 bgcolor=#E9E9E9
| 407357 ||  || — || February 3, 2003 || Kitt Peak || Spacewatch || — || align=right | 1.3 km || 
|-id=358 bgcolor=#E9E9E9
| 407358 ||  || — || September 10, 2010 || Kitt Peak || Spacewatch || — || align=right | 1.4 km || 
|-id=359 bgcolor=#E9E9E9
| 407359 ||  || — || September 10, 2010 || Kitt Peak || Spacewatch || — || align=right | 1.9 km || 
|-id=360 bgcolor=#E9E9E9
| 407360 ||  || — || May 27, 2009 || Mount Lemmon || Mount Lemmon Survey || — || align=right | 1.1 km || 
|-id=361 bgcolor=#E9E9E9
| 407361 ||  || — || September 10, 2010 || Kitt Peak || Spacewatch || — || align=right | 1.6 km || 
|-id=362 bgcolor=#E9E9E9
| 407362 ||  || — || September 10, 2010 || Kitt Peak || Spacewatch || AGN || align=right data-sort-value="0.97" | 970 m || 
|-id=363 bgcolor=#E9E9E9
| 407363 ||  || — || September 28, 2006 || Kitt Peak || Spacewatch || — || align=right data-sort-value="0.98" | 980 m || 
|-id=364 bgcolor=#E9E9E9
| 407364 ||  || — || September 28, 2006 || Mount Lemmon || Mount Lemmon Survey || — || align=right | 1.3 km || 
|-id=365 bgcolor=#E9E9E9
| 407365 ||  || — || February 9, 2007 || Kitt Peak || Spacewatch || — || align=right | 1.9 km || 
|-id=366 bgcolor=#E9E9E9
| 407366 ||  || — || September 11, 2010 || Kitt Peak || Spacewatch || — || align=right data-sort-value="0.92" | 920 m || 
|-id=367 bgcolor=#E9E9E9
| 407367 ||  || — || February 7, 2008 || Mount Lemmon || Mount Lemmon Survey || — || align=right | 1.0 km || 
|-id=368 bgcolor=#fefefe
| 407368 ||  || — || March 10, 2005 || Mount Lemmon || Mount Lemmon Survey || NYS || align=right data-sort-value="0.82" | 820 m || 
|-id=369 bgcolor=#E9E9E9
| 407369 ||  || — || October 6, 2002 || Socorro || LINEAR || — || align=right | 1.7 km || 
|-id=370 bgcolor=#E9E9E9
| 407370 ||  || — || September 10, 2010 || Kitt Peak || Spacewatch || — || align=right | 1.4 km || 
|-id=371 bgcolor=#E9E9E9
| 407371 ||  || — || March 13, 2008 || Kitt Peak || Spacewatch || ADE || align=right | 1.8 km || 
|-id=372 bgcolor=#fefefe
| 407372 ||  || — || September 27, 2006 || Mount Lemmon || Mount Lemmon Survey || — || align=right data-sort-value="0.76" | 760 m || 
|-id=373 bgcolor=#E9E9E9
| 407373 ||  || — || September 4, 2010 || Kitt Peak || Spacewatch || — || align=right | 1.1 km || 
|-id=374 bgcolor=#E9E9E9
| 407374 ||  || — || September 14, 2010 || Kitt Peak || Spacewatch || — || align=right data-sort-value="0.90" | 900 m || 
|-id=375 bgcolor=#E9E9E9
| 407375 ||  || — || June 16, 2010 || WISE || WISE || — || align=right | 1.2 km || 
|-id=376 bgcolor=#E9E9E9
| 407376 ||  || — || September 15, 2010 || Kitt Peak || Spacewatch || — || align=right | 1.4 km || 
|-id=377 bgcolor=#E9E9E9
| 407377 ||  || — || September 16, 2006 || Kitt Peak || Spacewatch || — || align=right data-sort-value="0.87" | 870 m || 
|-id=378 bgcolor=#E9E9E9
| 407378 ||  || — || October 2, 2006 || Mount Lemmon || Mount Lemmon Survey || — || align=right | 1.8 km || 
|-id=379 bgcolor=#E9E9E9
| 407379 ||  || — || March 1, 2009 || Mount Lemmon || Mount Lemmon Survey || — || align=right | 1.4 km || 
|-id=380 bgcolor=#E9E9E9
| 407380 ||  || — || September 5, 2010 || Mount Lemmon || Mount Lemmon Survey || — || align=right | 2.1 km || 
|-id=381 bgcolor=#E9E9E9
| 407381 ||  || — || September 9, 2010 || Kitt Peak || Spacewatch || — || align=right | 1.6 km || 
|-id=382 bgcolor=#E9E9E9
| 407382 ||  || — || September 11, 2010 || Kitt Peak || Spacewatch || — || align=right | 2.2 km || 
|-id=383 bgcolor=#E9E9E9
| 407383 ||  || — || September 17, 2006 || Kitt Peak || Spacewatch || MAR || align=right data-sort-value="0.84" | 840 m || 
|-id=384 bgcolor=#E9E9E9
| 407384 ||  || — || September 4, 2010 || Kitt Peak || Spacewatch || — || align=right | 1.5 km || 
|-id=385 bgcolor=#E9E9E9
| 407385 ||  || — || June 15, 2010 || Mount Lemmon || Mount Lemmon Survey || — || align=right | 2.0 km || 
|-id=386 bgcolor=#E9E9E9
| 407386 ||  || — || September 11, 2010 || Mount Lemmon || Mount Lemmon Survey || — || align=right | 1.7 km || 
|-id=387 bgcolor=#E9E9E9
| 407387 ||  || — || September 17, 2006 || Kitt Peak || Spacewatch || — || align=right data-sort-value="0.96" | 960 m || 
|-id=388 bgcolor=#E9E9E9
| 407388 ||  || — || September 27, 2010 || Kitt Peak || Spacewatch || HNS || align=right | 1.3 km || 
|-id=389 bgcolor=#E9E9E9
| 407389 ||  || — || October 19, 2006 || Mount Lemmon || Mount Lemmon Survey || (5) || align=right data-sort-value="0.89" | 890 m || 
|-id=390 bgcolor=#E9E9E9
| 407390 ||  || — || February 28, 2008 || Mount Lemmon || Mount Lemmon Survey || — || align=right | 1.9 km || 
|-id=391 bgcolor=#E9E9E9
| 407391 ||  || — || May 11, 2005 || Mount Lemmon || Mount Lemmon Survey || (5) || align=right data-sort-value="0.72" | 720 m || 
|-id=392 bgcolor=#E9E9E9
| 407392 ||  || — || October 3, 2006 || Mount Lemmon || Mount Lemmon Survey || — || align=right data-sort-value="0.86" | 860 m || 
|-id=393 bgcolor=#E9E9E9
| 407393 ||  || — || February 8, 2008 || Kitt Peak || Spacewatch || — || align=right | 1.9 km || 
|-id=394 bgcolor=#E9E9E9
| 407394 ||  || — || September 14, 2010 || Kitt Peak || Spacewatch || — || align=right | 1.2 km || 
|-id=395 bgcolor=#E9E9E9
| 407395 ||  || — || September 30, 2006 || Mount Lemmon || Mount Lemmon Survey || — || align=right | 1.5 km || 
|-id=396 bgcolor=#E9E9E9
| 407396 ||  || — || November 14, 2006 || Kitt Peak || Spacewatch || WIT || align=right data-sort-value="0.90" | 900 m || 
|-id=397 bgcolor=#E9E9E9
| 407397 ||  || — || October 3, 2006 || Mount Lemmon || Mount Lemmon Survey || — || align=right | 1.0 km || 
|-id=398 bgcolor=#E9E9E9
| 407398 ||  || — || October 2, 2006 || Mount Lemmon || Mount Lemmon Survey || — || align=right data-sort-value="0.93" | 930 m || 
|-id=399 bgcolor=#fefefe
| 407399 ||  || — || August 29, 2006 || Kitt Peak || Spacewatch || — || align=right data-sort-value="0.72" | 720 m || 
|-id=400 bgcolor=#E9E9E9
| 407400 ||  || — || November 11, 2006 || Mount Lemmon || Mount Lemmon Survey || — || align=right | 2.1 km || 
|}

407401–407500 

|-bgcolor=#E9E9E9
| 407401 ||  || — || September 30, 2006 || Mount Lemmon || Mount Lemmon Survey || — || align=right | 1.4 km || 
|-id=402 bgcolor=#E9E9E9
| 407402 ||  || — || September 14, 2010 || Kitt Peak || Spacewatch || — || align=right | 1.5 km || 
|-id=403 bgcolor=#E9E9E9
| 407403 ||  || — || October 2, 2010 || Kitt Peak || Spacewatch || — || align=right | 1.6 km || 
|-id=404 bgcolor=#E9E9E9
| 407404 ||  || — || November 15, 2006 || Kitt Peak || Spacewatch || — || align=right | 1.2 km || 
|-id=405 bgcolor=#E9E9E9
| 407405 ||  || — || April 6, 2008 || Mount Lemmon || Mount Lemmon Survey || HNS || align=right | 1.0 km || 
|-id=406 bgcolor=#E9E9E9
| 407406 ||  || — || October 3, 2010 || Kitt Peak || Spacewatch || AGN || align=right | 1.1 km || 
|-id=407 bgcolor=#E9E9E9
| 407407 ||  || — || March 2, 2008 || Kitt Peak || Spacewatch || critical || align=right | 1.3 km || 
|-id=408 bgcolor=#E9E9E9
| 407408 ||  || — || September 17, 2010 || Kitt Peak || Spacewatch || — || align=right | 1.5 km || 
|-id=409 bgcolor=#E9E9E9
| 407409 ||  || — || May 15, 2009 || Kitt Peak || Spacewatch || — || align=right | 1.5 km || 
|-id=410 bgcolor=#E9E9E9
| 407410 ||  || — || November 18, 2006 || Mount Lemmon || Mount Lemmon Survey || (5) || align=right data-sort-value="0.89" | 890 m || 
|-id=411 bgcolor=#E9E9E9
| 407411 ||  || — || October 23, 2006 || Kitt Peak || Spacewatch || — || align=right | 1.4 km || 
|-id=412 bgcolor=#E9E9E9
| 407412 ||  || — || March 13, 2008 || Kitt Peak || Spacewatch || AGN || align=right | 1.1 km || 
|-id=413 bgcolor=#E9E9E9
| 407413 ||  || — || September 17, 2010 || Kitt Peak || Spacewatch || AGN || align=right | 1.1 km || 
|-id=414 bgcolor=#E9E9E9
| 407414 ||  || — || October 19, 2006 || Kitt Peak || Spacewatch || — || align=right | 2.2 km || 
|-id=415 bgcolor=#E9E9E9
| 407415 ||  || — || September 18, 2006 || Kitt Peak || Spacewatch || — || align=right data-sort-value="0.84" | 840 m || 
|-id=416 bgcolor=#E9E9E9
| 407416 ||  || — || March 28, 2008 || Mount Lemmon || Mount Lemmon Survey || — || align=right | 2.0 km || 
|-id=417 bgcolor=#E9E9E9
| 407417 ||  || — || October 27, 2006 || Mount Lemmon || Mount Lemmon Survey || — || align=right | 1.5 km || 
|-id=418 bgcolor=#E9E9E9
| 407418 ||  || — || October 20, 2006 || Mount Lemmon || Mount Lemmon Survey || — || align=right | 1.4 km || 
|-id=419 bgcolor=#E9E9E9
| 407419 ||  || — || October 2, 2006 || Mount Lemmon || Mount Lemmon Survey || — || align=right data-sort-value="0.82" | 820 m || 
|-id=420 bgcolor=#E9E9E9
| 407420 ||  || — || October 1, 2010 || Mount Lemmon || Mount Lemmon Survey || — || align=right | 1.8 km || 
|-id=421 bgcolor=#E9E9E9
| 407421 ||  || — || September 4, 2010 || Kitt Peak || Spacewatch || — || align=right | 1.3 km || 
|-id=422 bgcolor=#E9E9E9
| 407422 ||  || — || September 16, 2010 || Kitt Peak || Spacewatch || AGN || align=right | 1.2 km || 
|-id=423 bgcolor=#E9E9E9
| 407423 ||  || — || September 16, 2010 || Kitt Peak || Spacewatch || — || align=right | 1.9 km || 
|-id=424 bgcolor=#E9E9E9
| 407424 ||  || — || October 17, 2006 || Mount Lemmon || Mount Lemmon Survey || — || align=right | 1.3 km || 
|-id=425 bgcolor=#E9E9E9
| 407425 ||  || — || March 17, 2004 || Kitt Peak || Spacewatch || MAR || align=right | 1.0 km || 
|-id=426 bgcolor=#E9E9E9
| 407426 ||  || — || April 13, 2004 || Kitt Peak || Spacewatch || NEM || align=right | 2.2 km || 
|-id=427 bgcolor=#E9E9E9
| 407427 ||  || — || November 14, 2006 || Kitt Peak || Spacewatch || — || align=right | 1.4 km || 
|-id=428 bgcolor=#E9E9E9
| 407428 ||  || — || March 11, 2008 || Kitt Peak || Spacewatch || — || align=right | 2.0 km || 
|-id=429 bgcolor=#E9E9E9
| 407429 ||  || — || September 30, 2006 || Mount Lemmon || Mount Lemmon Survey || — || align=right | 2.2 km || 
|-id=430 bgcolor=#E9E9E9
| 407430 ||  || — || March 10, 2008 || Kitt Peak || Spacewatch || WIT || align=right data-sort-value="0.83" | 830 m || 
|-id=431 bgcolor=#E9E9E9
| 407431 ||  || — || February 7, 2008 || Kitt Peak || Spacewatch || EUN || align=right | 1.2 km || 
|-id=432 bgcolor=#E9E9E9
| 407432 ||  || — || October 11, 2010 || Mount Lemmon || Mount Lemmon Survey || — || align=right | 1.3 km || 
|-id=433 bgcolor=#E9E9E9
| 407433 ||  || — || October 11, 2010 || Mount Lemmon || Mount Lemmon Survey || — || align=right | 1.9 km || 
|-id=434 bgcolor=#E9E9E9
| 407434 ||  || — || October 30, 2006 || Catalina || CSS || — || align=right data-sort-value="0.86" | 860 m || 
|-id=435 bgcolor=#E9E9E9
| 407435 ||  || — || August 29, 2006 || Catalina || CSS || MAR || align=right | 1.9 km || 
|-id=436 bgcolor=#E9E9E9
| 407436 ||  || — || August 9, 2010 || Kitt Peak || Spacewatch || EUN || align=right | 1.2 km || 
|-id=437 bgcolor=#E9E9E9
| 407437 ||  || — || October 8, 2010 || Catalina || CSS || EUN || align=right | 1.3 km || 
|-id=438 bgcolor=#E9E9E9
| 407438 ||  || — || December 21, 2006 || Kitt Peak || Spacewatch || AEO || align=right | 1.0 km || 
|-id=439 bgcolor=#E9E9E9
| 407439 ||  || — || October 23, 2006 || Kitt Peak || Spacewatch || EUN || align=right data-sort-value="0.92" | 920 m || 
|-id=440 bgcolor=#E9E9E9
| 407440 ||  || — || September 10, 2010 || Kitt Peak || Spacewatch || — || align=right | 1.1 km || 
|-id=441 bgcolor=#E9E9E9
| 407441 ||  || — || March 11, 2008 || Mount Lemmon || Mount Lemmon Survey || PAD || align=right | 1.2 km || 
|-id=442 bgcolor=#d6d6d6
| 407442 ||  || — || October 13, 2010 || Mount Lemmon || Mount Lemmon Survey || VER || align=right | 2.8 km || 
|-id=443 bgcolor=#E9E9E9
| 407443 ||  || — || April 3, 2008 || Mount Lemmon || Mount Lemmon Survey || — || align=right | 1.3 km || 
|-id=444 bgcolor=#E9E9E9
| 407444 ||  || — || March 6, 2008 || Mount Lemmon || Mount Lemmon Survey || — || align=right | 1.6 km || 
|-id=445 bgcolor=#E9E9E9
| 407445 ||  || — || September 18, 2010 || Mount Lemmon || Mount Lemmon Survey || — || align=right | 1.7 km || 
|-id=446 bgcolor=#d6d6d6
| 407446 ||  || — || October 1, 2005 || Mount Lemmon || Mount Lemmon Survey || — || align=right | 2.1 km || 
|-id=447 bgcolor=#E9E9E9
| 407447 ||  || — || December 13, 2006 || Kitt Peak || Spacewatch || HOF || align=right | 2.0 km || 
|-id=448 bgcolor=#E9E9E9
| 407448 ||  || — || October 13, 2010 || Catalina || CSS || NEM || align=right | 2.2 km || 
|-id=449 bgcolor=#E9E9E9
| 407449 ||  || — || July 10, 2005 || Kitt Peak || Spacewatch || — || align=right | 1.5 km || 
|-id=450 bgcolor=#E9E9E9
| 407450 ||  || — || March 6, 2008 || Mount Lemmon || Mount Lemmon Survey || (5) || align=right data-sort-value="0.82" | 820 m || 
|-id=451 bgcolor=#d6d6d6
| 407451 ||  || — || October 28, 2010 || Mount Lemmon || Mount Lemmon Survey || — || align=right | 3.1 km || 
|-id=452 bgcolor=#E9E9E9
| 407452 ||  || — || October 3, 2005 || Catalina || CSS || — || align=right | 3.0 km || 
|-id=453 bgcolor=#E9E9E9
| 407453 ||  || — || September 16, 2010 || Kitt Peak || Spacewatch || — || align=right | 2.0 km || 
|-id=454 bgcolor=#E9E9E9
| 407454 ||  || — || March 29, 2008 || Kitt Peak || Spacewatch || MRX || align=right | 1.2 km || 
|-id=455 bgcolor=#d6d6d6
| 407455 ||  || — || October 29, 2010 || Mount Lemmon || Mount Lemmon Survey || EOS || align=right | 1.8 km || 
|-id=456 bgcolor=#E9E9E9
| 407456 ||  || — || November 16, 2006 || Kitt Peak || Spacewatch || — || align=right | 1.2 km || 
|-id=457 bgcolor=#E9E9E9
| 407457 ||  || — || October 19, 2010 || Mount Lemmon || Mount Lemmon Survey || AGN || align=right | 1.3 km || 
|-id=458 bgcolor=#E9E9E9
| 407458 ||  || — || October 13, 2010 || Mount Lemmon || Mount Lemmon Survey || (5) || align=right data-sort-value="0.89" | 890 m || 
|-id=459 bgcolor=#E9E9E9
| 407459 ||  || — || March 29, 2008 || Mount Lemmon || Mount Lemmon Survey || — || align=right | 1.5 km || 
|-id=460 bgcolor=#E9E9E9
| 407460 ||  || — || January 17, 2007 || Catalina || CSS || — || align=right | 2.6 km || 
|-id=461 bgcolor=#d6d6d6
| 407461 ||  || — || May 1, 2008 || Siding Spring || SSS || — || align=right | 4.6 km || 
|-id=462 bgcolor=#d6d6d6
| 407462 ||  || — || October 29, 2010 || Kitt Peak || Spacewatch || EOS || align=right | 2.5 km || 
|-id=463 bgcolor=#E9E9E9
| 407463 ||  || — || February 26, 2003 || Campo Imperatore || CINEOS || — || align=right | 2.9 km || 
|-id=464 bgcolor=#E9E9E9
| 407464 ||  || — || September 19, 2001 || Socorro || LINEAR || — || align=right | 1.7 km || 
|-id=465 bgcolor=#E9E9E9
| 407465 ||  || — || August 27, 2001 || Kitt Peak || Spacewatch || — || align=right | 1.4 km || 
|-id=466 bgcolor=#E9E9E9
| 407466 ||  || — || September 13, 2005 || Kitt Peak || Spacewatch || — || align=right | 1.8 km || 
|-id=467 bgcolor=#E9E9E9
| 407467 ||  || — || November 18, 2006 || Kitt Peak || Spacewatch || — || align=right | 1.2 km || 
|-id=468 bgcolor=#E9E9E9
| 407468 ||  || — || October 30, 2010 || Kitt Peak || Spacewatch || (5) || align=right data-sort-value="0.88" | 880 m || 
|-id=469 bgcolor=#E9E9E9
| 407469 ||  || — || March 10, 2008 || Kitt Peak || Spacewatch || — || align=right | 2.7 km || 
|-id=470 bgcolor=#d6d6d6
| 407470 ||  || — || October 30, 2010 || Mount Lemmon || Mount Lemmon Survey || — || align=right | 2.3 km || 
|-id=471 bgcolor=#d6d6d6
| 407471 ||  || — || November 1, 2005 || Mount Lemmon || Mount Lemmon Survey || EOS || align=right | 1.9 km || 
|-id=472 bgcolor=#E9E9E9
| 407472 ||  || — || November 25, 2006 || Mount Lemmon || Mount Lemmon Survey || — || align=right data-sort-value="0.91" | 910 m || 
|-id=473 bgcolor=#E9E9E9
| 407473 ||  || — || October 8, 2005 || Catalina || CSS || — || align=right | 2.4 km || 
|-id=474 bgcolor=#d6d6d6
| 407474 ||  || — || October 13, 2010 || Mount Lemmon || Mount Lemmon Survey || — || align=right | 2.8 km || 
|-id=475 bgcolor=#E9E9E9
| 407475 ||  || — || September 21, 2001 || Socorro || LINEAR || — || align=right | 1.7 km || 
|-id=476 bgcolor=#E9E9E9
| 407476 ||  || — || November 20, 2006 || Kitt Peak || Spacewatch || — || align=right data-sort-value="0.93" | 930 m || 
|-id=477 bgcolor=#E9E9E9
| 407477 ||  || — || November 15, 2006 || Catalina || CSS || — || align=right | 1.2 km || 
|-id=478 bgcolor=#d6d6d6
| 407478 ||  || — || October 30, 2010 || Mount Lemmon || Mount Lemmon Survey || — || align=right | 2.1 km || 
|-id=479 bgcolor=#d6d6d6
| 407479 ||  || — || October 13, 2010 || Mount Lemmon || Mount Lemmon Survey || EOS || align=right | 2.3 km || 
|-id=480 bgcolor=#E9E9E9
| 407480 ||  || — || November 17, 2006 || Mount Lemmon || Mount Lemmon Survey || — || align=right | 1.5 km || 
|-id=481 bgcolor=#E9E9E9
| 407481 ||  || — || December 7, 2001 || Kitt Peak || Spacewatch || — || align=right | 2.1 km || 
|-id=482 bgcolor=#d6d6d6
| 407482 ||  || — || September 19, 1995 || Kitt Peak || Spacewatch || KOR || align=right | 1.2 km || 
|-id=483 bgcolor=#E9E9E9
| 407483 ||  || — || October 30, 2010 || Mount Lemmon || Mount Lemmon Survey || — || align=right | 1.4 km || 
|-id=484 bgcolor=#E9E9E9
| 407484 ||  || — || September 3, 2010 || Mount Lemmon || Mount Lemmon Survey || — || align=right | 1.1 km || 
|-id=485 bgcolor=#E9E9E9
| 407485 ||  || — || January 22, 1998 || Kitt Peak || Spacewatch || — || align=right | 2.0 km || 
|-id=486 bgcolor=#E9E9E9
| 407486 ||  || — || November 20, 2006 || Kitt Peak || Spacewatch || — || align=right | 1.0 km || 
|-id=487 bgcolor=#E9E9E9
| 407487 ||  || — || October 20, 2001 || Socorro || LINEAR || — || align=right | 1.7 km || 
|-id=488 bgcolor=#E9E9E9
| 407488 ||  || — || November 20, 2001 || Socorro || LINEAR || — || align=right | 2.5 km || 
|-id=489 bgcolor=#E9E9E9
| 407489 ||  || — || October 23, 2006 || Mount Lemmon || Mount Lemmon Survey || — || align=right | 1.3 km || 
|-id=490 bgcolor=#E9E9E9
| 407490 ||  || — || September 11, 2010 || Mount Lemmon || Mount Lemmon Survey || — || align=right | 1.5 km || 
|-id=491 bgcolor=#d6d6d6
| 407491 ||  || — || October 1, 2005 || Kitt Peak || Spacewatch || KOR || align=right | 1.3 km || 
|-id=492 bgcolor=#E9E9E9
| 407492 ||  || — || October 13, 2010 || Mount Lemmon || Mount Lemmon Survey || — || align=right | 2.0 km || 
|-id=493 bgcolor=#d6d6d6
| 407493 ||  || — || November 7, 2010 || Kitt Peak || Spacewatch || — || align=right | 3.1 km || 
|-id=494 bgcolor=#E9E9E9
| 407494 ||  || — || November 23, 2006 || Kitt Peak || Spacewatch || — || align=right | 1.4 km || 
|-id=495 bgcolor=#E9E9E9
| 407495 ||  || — || November 20, 2001 || Socorro || LINEAR || — || align=right | 2.3 km || 
|-id=496 bgcolor=#E9E9E9
| 407496 ||  || — || November 27, 2006 || Mount Lemmon || Mount Lemmon Survey || — || align=right | 2.3 km || 
|-id=497 bgcolor=#E9E9E9
| 407497 ||  || — || September 13, 2005 || Kitt Peak || Spacewatch || — || align=right | 1.7 km || 
|-id=498 bgcolor=#d6d6d6
| 407498 ||  || — || October 28, 2010 || Kitt Peak || Spacewatch || — || align=right | 3.4 km || 
|-id=499 bgcolor=#E9E9E9
| 407499 ||  || — || September 26, 2005 || Kitt Peak || Spacewatch || HOF || align=right | 2.8 km || 
|-id=500 bgcolor=#d6d6d6
| 407500 ||  || — || September 4, 2010 || Kitt Peak || Spacewatch || EMA || align=right | 3.3 km || 
|}

407501–407600 

|-bgcolor=#d6d6d6
| 407501 ||  || — || November 6, 2010 || Kitt Peak || Spacewatch || EOS || align=right | 2.3 km || 
|-id=502 bgcolor=#d6d6d6
| 407502 ||  || — || March 14, 2007 || Kitt Peak || Spacewatch || — || align=right | 3.0 km || 
|-id=503 bgcolor=#E9E9E9
| 407503 ||  || — || September 28, 1997 || Kitt Peak || Spacewatch || — || align=right | 1.3 km || 
|-id=504 bgcolor=#E9E9E9
| 407504 ||  || — || November 8, 2010 || Mount Lemmon || Mount Lemmon Survey || — || align=right | 1.4 km || 
|-id=505 bgcolor=#E9E9E9
| 407505 ||  || — || November 19, 2001 || Socorro || LINEAR || — || align=right | 1.8 km || 
|-id=506 bgcolor=#E9E9E9
| 407506 ||  || — || November 1, 2010 || Mount Lemmon || Mount Lemmon Survey || — || align=right | 2.1 km || 
|-id=507 bgcolor=#E9E9E9
| 407507 ||  || — || November 5, 2010 || Kitt Peak || Spacewatch || — || align=right | 1.9 km || 
|-id=508 bgcolor=#d6d6d6
| 407508 ||  || — || November 5, 2010 || Kitt Peak || Spacewatch || — || align=right | 3.5 km || 
|-id=509 bgcolor=#E9E9E9
| 407509 ||  || — || September 29, 2005 || Mount Lemmon || Mount Lemmon Survey || HOF || align=right | 2.3 km || 
|-id=510 bgcolor=#E9E9E9
| 407510 ||  || — || March 12, 2008 || Mount Lemmon || Mount Lemmon Survey || — || align=right | 2.4 km || 
|-id=511 bgcolor=#d6d6d6
| 407511 ||  || — || October 29, 2010 || Kitt Peak || Spacewatch || — || align=right | 3.5 km || 
|-id=512 bgcolor=#E9E9E9
| 407512 ||  || — || January 27, 2007 || Mount Lemmon || Mount Lemmon Survey || — || align=right | 1.6 km || 
|-id=513 bgcolor=#E9E9E9
| 407513 ||  || — || March 29, 2008 || Mount Lemmon || Mount Lemmon Survey || — || align=right | 2.2 km || 
|-id=514 bgcolor=#E9E9E9
| 407514 ||  || — || November 2, 2010 || Mount Lemmon || Mount Lemmon Survey || AGN || align=right | 1.2 km || 
|-id=515 bgcolor=#E9E9E9
| 407515 ||  || — || April 11, 2008 || Kitt Peak || Spacewatch || NEM || align=right | 2.1 km || 
|-id=516 bgcolor=#E9E9E9
| 407516 ||  || — || October 28, 1997 || Kitt Peak || Spacewatch ||  || align=right | 1.5 km || 
|-id=517 bgcolor=#d6d6d6
| 407517 ||  || — || October 21, 1995 || Kitt Peak || Spacewatch || — || align=right | 2.1 km || 
|-id=518 bgcolor=#d6d6d6
| 407518 ||  || — || November 10, 2010 || Mount Lemmon || Mount Lemmon Survey || EOS || align=right | 1.8 km || 
|-id=519 bgcolor=#E9E9E9
| 407519 ||  || — || April 13, 2008 || Mount Lemmon || Mount Lemmon Survey || — || align=right | 1.9 km || 
|-id=520 bgcolor=#E9E9E9
| 407520 ||  || — || January 10, 2007 || Kitt Peak || Spacewatch || — || align=right | 2.1 km || 
|-id=521 bgcolor=#E9E9E9
| 407521 ||  || — || March 28, 2008 || Mount Lemmon || Mount Lemmon Survey || — || align=right | 1.7 km || 
|-id=522 bgcolor=#E9E9E9
| 407522 ||  || — || April 14, 2008 || Kitt Peak || Spacewatch || — || align=right | 2.9 km || 
|-id=523 bgcolor=#d6d6d6
| 407523 ||  || — || November 10, 2010 || Mount Lemmon || Mount Lemmon Survey || EOS || align=right | 2.1 km || 
|-id=524 bgcolor=#E9E9E9
| 407524 ||  || — || October 30, 2010 || Kitt Peak || Spacewatch || — || align=right | 2.9 km || 
|-id=525 bgcolor=#E9E9E9
| 407525 ||  || — || March 30, 2008 || Kitt Peak || Spacewatch || WIT || align=right data-sort-value="0.92" | 920 m || 
|-id=526 bgcolor=#E9E9E9
| 407526 ||  || — || February 16, 2007 || Catalina || CSS || — || align=right | 2.6 km || 
|-id=527 bgcolor=#E9E9E9
| 407527 ||  || — || September 1, 2005 || Kitt Peak || Spacewatch || MRX || align=right data-sort-value="0.87" | 870 m || 
|-id=528 bgcolor=#E9E9E9
| 407528 ||  || — || March 1, 2008 || Kitt Peak || Spacewatch || — || align=right | 2.1 km || 
|-id=529 bgcolor=#E9E9E9
| 407529 ||  || — || January 16, 2007 || Catalina || CSS || — || align=right | 1.8 km || 
|-id=530 bgcolor=#E9E9E9
| 407530 ||  || — || January 27, 2007 || Mount Lemmon || Mount Lemmon Survey || — || align=right | 2.3 km || 
|-id=531 bgcolor=#E9E9E9
| 407531 ||  || — || October 11, 2010 || Mount Lemmon || Mount Lemmon Survey || — || align=right | 1.5 km || 
|-id=532 bgcolor=#E9E9E9
| 407532 ||  || — || April 5, 2008 || Mount Lemmon || Mount Lemmon Survey || WIT || align=right | 1.1 km || 
|-id=533 bgcolor=#E9E9E9
| 407533 ||  || — || March 31, 2008 || Kitt Peak || Spacewatch || — || align=right | 1.8 km || 
|-id=534 bgcolor=#E9E9E9
| 407534 ||  || — || September 11, 2010 || Mount Lemmon || Mount Lemmon Survey || — || align=right | 2.5 km || 
|-id=535 bgcolor=#d6d6d6
| 407535 ||  || — || October 25, 2005 || Kitt Peak || Spacewatch || EOS || align=right | 2.0 km || 
|-id=536 bgcolor=#d6d6d6
| 407536 ||  || — || November 29, 2005 || Kitt Peak || Spacewatch || — || align=right | 2.6 km || 
|-id=537 bgcolor=#d6d6d6
| 407537 ||  || — || November 3, 2010 || Mount Lemmon || Mount Lemmon Survey || — || align=right | 3.5 km || 
|-id=538 bgcolor=#E9E9E9
| 407538 ||  || — || November 28, 2006 || Mount Lemmon || Mount Lemmon Survey || — || align=right | 2.2 km || 
|-id=539 bgcolor=#E9E9E9
| 407539 ||  || — || September 13, 2005 || Kitt Peak || Spacewatch || — || align=right | 2.1 km || 
|-id=540 bgcolor=#E9E9E9
| 407540 ||  || — || September 29, 2005 || Mount Lemmon || Mount Lemmon Survey || — || align=right | 1.9 km || 
|-id=541 bgcolor=#d6d6d6
| 407541 ||  || — || November 25, 2005 || Kitt Peak || Spacewatch || — || align=right | 2.5 km || 
|-id=542 bgcolor=#E9E9E9
| 407542 ||  || — || November 14, 2010 || Kitt Peak || Spacewatch || AGN || align=right | 1.2 km || 
|-id=543 bgcolor=#d6d6d6
| 407543 ||  || — || October 30, 2005 || Kitt Peak || Spacewatch || KOR || align=right | 1.5 km || 
|-id=544 bgcolor=#d6d6d6
| 407544 ||  || — || January 12, 1996 || Kitt Peak || Spacewatch || — || align=right | 2.7 km || 
|-id=545 bgcolor=#E9E9E9
| 407545 ||  || — || November 2, 2010 || Kitt Peak || Spacewatch || — || align=right | 2.2 km || 
|-id=546 bgcolor=#E9E9E9
| 407546 ||  || — || December 13, 2006 || Catalina || CSS || — || align=right | 1.3 km || 
|-id=547 bgcolor=#d6d6d6
| 407547 ||  || — || November 10, 2010 || Kitt Peak || Spacewatch || EOS || align=right | 2.7 km || 
|-id=548 bgcolor=#E9E9E9
| 407548 ||  || — || March 27, 2003 || Kitt Peak || Spacewatch || — || align=right | 3.2 km || 
|-id=549 bgcolor=#E9E9E9
| 407549 ||  || — || November 19, 2006 || Kitt Peak || Spacewatch || — || align=right | 1.1 km || 
|-id=550 bgcolor=#E9E9E9
| 407550 ||  || — || February 26, 2008 || Mount Lemmon || Mount Lemmon Survey || (5) || align=right | 1.4 km || 
|-id=551 bgcolor=#d6d6d6
| 407551 ||  || — || November 11, 2004 || Anderson Mesa || LONEOS || — || align=right | 4.6 km || 
|-id=552 bgcolor=#E9E9E9
| 407552 ||  || — || December 27, 2006 || Mount Lemmon || Mount Lemmon Survey || — || align=right | 1.5 km || 
|-id=553 bgcolor=#E9E9E9
| 407553 ||  || — || November 25, 2006 || Kitt Peak || Spacewatch || — || align=right | 1.2 km || 
|-id=554 bgcolor=#d6d6d6
| 407554 ||  || — || November 10, 2005 || Mount Lemmon || Mount Lemmon Survey || — || align=right | 2.7 km || 
|-id=555 bgcolor=#E9E9E9
| 407555 ||  || — || October 25, 2005 || Kitt Peak || Spacewatch || — || align=right | 2.3 km || 
|-id=556 bgcolor=#E9E9E9
| 407556 ||  || — || November 14, 2010 || Mount Lemmon || Mount Lemmon Survey || GEF || align=right | 1.2 km || 
|-id=557 bgcolor=#d6d6d6
| 407557 ||  || — || November 10, 2010 || Mount Lemmon || Mount Lemmon Survey || — || align=right | 3.4 km || 
|-id=558 bgcolor=#d6d6d6
| 407558 ||  || — || December 22, 2005 || Catalina || CSS || — || align=right | 3.0 km || 
|-id=559 bgcolor=#d6d6d6
| 407559 ||  || — || November 6, 2010 || Kitt Peak || Spacewatch || — || align=right | 4.0 km || 
|-id=560 bgcolor=#E9E9E9
| 407560 ||  || — || February 28, 2008 || Kitt Peak || Spacewatch || — || align=right | 1.3 km || 
|-id=561 bgcolor=#d6d6d6
| 407561 ||  || — || January 23, 2006 || Kitt Peak || Spacewatch || — || align=right | 2.4 km || 
|-id=562 bgcolor=#E9E9E9
| 407562 ||  || — || July 4, 2005 || Mount Lemmon || Mount Lemmon Survey || — || align=right | 1.0 km || 
|-id=563 bgcolor=#E9E9E9
| 407563 ||  || — || December 14, 2006 || Kitt Peak || Spacewatch || — || align=right | 1.1 km || 
|-id=564 bgcolor=#E9E9E9
| 407564 ||  || — || December 17, 2001 || Kitt Peak || Spacewatch || — || align=right | 1.7 km || 
|-id=565 bgcolor=#d6d6d6
| 407565 ||  || — || December 7, 2005 || Kitt Peak || Spacewatch || — || align=right | 4.3 km || 
|-id=566 bgcolor=#d6d6d6
| 407566 ||  || — || November 13, 2010 || Kitt Peak || Spacewatch || — || align=right | 3.9 km || 
|-id=567 bgcolor=#E9E9E9
| 407567 ||  || — || September 28, 2006 || Mount Lemmon || Mount Lemmon Survey || — || align=right | 1.7 km || 
|-id=568 bgcolor=#d6d6d6
| 407568 ||  || — || April 26, 2007 || Kitt Peak || Spacewatch || VER || align=right | 2.9 km || 
|-id=569 bgcolor=#E9E9E9
| 407569 ||  || — || December 9, 2001 || Socorro || LINEAR || — || align=right | 2.4 km || 
|-id=570 bgcolor=#d6d6d6
| 407570 ||  || — || October 27, 2009 || Mount Lemmon || Mount Lemmon Survey || — || align=right | 4.0 km || 
|-id=571 bgcolor=#E9E9E9
| 407571 ||  || — || November 7, 2010 || Mount Lemmon || Mount Lemmon Survey || GEF || align=right | 1.6 km || 
|-id=572 bgcolor=#d6d6d6
| 407572 ||  || — || September 22, 2009 || Catalina || CSS || — || align=right | 3.4 km || 
|-id=573 bgcolor=#d6d6d6
| 407573 ||  || — || December 31, 1994 || Kitt Peak || Spacewatch || EOS || align=right | 2.6 km || 
|-id=574 bgcolor=#d6d6d6
| 407574 ||  || — || December 14, 2010 || Mount Lemmon || Mount Lemmon Survey || — || align=right | 3.2 km || 
|-id=575 bgcolor=#d6d6d6
| 407575 ||  || — || November 15, 2010 || Mount Lemmon || Mount Lemmon Survey || — || align=right | 3.1 km || 
|-id=576 bgcolor=#E9E9E9
| 407576 ||  || — || February 17, 2007 || Catalina || CSS || — || align=right | 1.1 km || 
|-id=577 bgcolor=#d6d6d6
| 407577 ||  || — || August 25, 1998 || Caussols || ODAS || — || align=right | 2.3 km || 
|-id=578 bgcolor=#d6d6d6
| 407578 ||  || — || January 26, 2000 || Kitt Peak || Spacewatch || EOS || align=right | 2.6 km || 
|-id=579 bgcolor=#d6d6d6
| 407579 ||  || — || December 30, 2005 || Mount Lemmon || Mount Lemmon Survey || — || align=right | 2.9 km || 
|-id=580 bgcolor=#d6d6d6
| 407580 ||  || — || October 2, 2009 || Mount Lemmon || Mount Lemmon Survey || — || align=right | 3.9 km || 
|-id=581 bgcolor=#d6d6d6
| 407581 ||  || — || January 27, 2006 || Kitt Peak || Spacewatch || — || align=right | 2.5 km || 
|-id=582 bgcolor=#d6d6d6
| 407582 ||  || — || September 24, 2009 || Kitt Peak || Spacewatch || — || align=right | 3.1 km || 
|-id=583 bgcolor=#d6d6d6
| 407583 ||  || — || January 5, 2000 || Kitt Peak || Spacewatch || — || align=right | 2.8 km || 
|-id=584 bgcolor=#d6d6d6
| 407584 ||  || — || January 11, 2011 || Catalina || CSS || — || align=right | 4.1 km || 
|-id=585 bgcolor=#d6d6d6
| 407585 ||  || — || December 26, 2005 || Mount Lemmon || Mount Lemmon Survey || EOS || align=right | 1.9 km || 
|-id=586 bgcolor=#d6d6d6
| 407586 ||  || — || January 21, 2010 || WISE || WISE || — || align=right | 3.6 km || 
|-id=587 bgcolor=#d6d6d6
| 407587 ||  || — || December 6, 2010 || Mount Lemmon || Mount Lemmon Survey || — || align=right | 3.2 km || 
|-id=588 bgcolor=#d6d6d6
| 407588 ||  || — || August 29, 2009 || Kitt Peak || Spacewatch || — || align=right | 2.1 km || 
|-id=589 bgcolor=#d6d6d6
| 407589 ||  || — || May 16, 2007 || Mount Lemmon || Mount Lemmon Survey || — || align=right | 4.1 km || 
|-id=590 bgcolor=#d6d6d6
| 407590 ||  || — || September 19, 2003 || Kitt Peak || Spacewatch || — || align=right | 2.7 km || 
|-id=591 bgcolor=#d6d6d6
| 407591 ||  || — || September 20, 2003 || Kitt Peak || Spacewatch || — || align=right | 2.9 km || 
|-id=592 bgcolor=#E9E9E9
| 407592 ||  || — || December 11, 2001 || Socorro || LINEAR || — || align=right | 2.9 km || 
|-id=593 bgcolor=#d6d6d6
| 407593 ||  || — || November 3, 2010 || Mount Lemmon || Mount Lemmon Survey || — || align=right | 4.1 km || 
|-id=594 bgcolor=#d6d6d6
| 407594 ||  || — || September 28, 2003 || Anderson Mesa || LONEOS || — || align=right | 3.2 km || 
|-id=595 bgcolor=#d6d6d6
| 407595 ||  || — || November 11, 2010 || Mount Lemmon || Mount Lemmon Survey || EOS || align=right | 2.3 km || 
|-id=596 bgcolor=#d6d6d6
| 407596 ||  || — || January 23, 2006 || Kitt Peak || Spacewatch || EOS || align=right | 1.9 km || 
|-id=597 bgcolor=#d6d6d6
| 407597 ||  || — || January 30, 2006 || Kitt Peak || Spacewatch || EOS || align=right | 2.2 km || 
|-id=598 bgcolor=#d6d6d6
| 407598 ||  || — || October 30, 2009 || Mount Lemmon || Mount Lemmon Survey || — || align=right | 3.4 km || 
|-id=599 bgcolor=#d6d6d6
| 407599 ||  || — || January 12, 2011 || Kitt Peak || Spacewatch || — || align=right | 3.3 km || 
|-id=600 bgcolor=#d6d6d6
| 407600 ||  || — || March 13, 2005 || Mount Lemmon || Mount Lemmon Survey || — || align=right | 4.5 km || 
|}

407601–407700 

|-bgcolor=#d6d6d6
| 407601 ||  || — || September 17, 2009 || Kitt Peak || Spacewatch || — || align=right | 3.2 km || 
|-id=602 bgcolor=#d6d6d6
| 407602 ||  || — || February 27, 2000 || Catalina || CSS || — || align=right | 3.7 km || 
|-id=603 bgcolor=#d6d6d6
| 407603 ||  || — || February 7, 2000 || Kitt Peak || Spacewatch || — || align=right | 2.9 km || 
|-id=604 bgcolor=#d6d6d6
| 407604 ||  || — || November 21, 2009 || Mount Lemmon || Mount Lemmon Survey || EMA || align=right | 3.2 km || 
|-id=605 bgcolor=#d6d6d6
| 407605 ||  || — || November 4, 2004 || Kitt Peak || Spacewatch || EOS || align=right | 2.4 km || 
|-id=606 bgcolor=#d6d6d6
| 407606 ||  || — || October 16, 2009 || Catalina || CSS || — || align=right | 3.7 km || 
|-id=607 bgcolor=#E9E9E9
| 407607 ||  || — || March 11, 2007 || Kitt Peak || Spacewatch || AEO || align=right | 1.2 km || 
|-id=608 bgcolor=#d6d6d6
| 407608 ||  || — || February 3, 2000 || Kitt Peak || Spacewatch || — || align=right | 3.0 km || 
|-id=609 bgcolor=#d6d6d6
| 407609 ||  || — || October 1, 2009 || Mount Lemmon || Mount Lemmon Survey || LIX || align=right | 3.2 km || 
|-id=610 bgcolor=#d6d6d6
| 407610 ||  || — || September 29, 2009 || Mount Lemmon || Mount Lemmon Survey || — || align=right | 2.7 km || 
|-id=611 bgcolor=#d6d6d6
| 407611 ||  || — || December 13, 2004 || Kitt Peak || Spacewatch || THM || align=right | 2.0 km || 
|-id=612 bgcolor=#d6d6d6
| 407612 ||  || — || January 26, 2006 || Mount Lemmon || Mount Lemmon Survey || — || align=right | 2.9 km || 
|-id=613 bgcolor=#d6d6d6
| 407613 ||  || — || January 9, 2006 || Kitt Peak || Spacewatch || EOS || align=right | 1.8 km || 
|-id=614 bgcolor=#d6d6d6
| 407614 ||  || — || September 17, 2003 || Kitt Peak || Spacewatch || — || align=right | 2.9 km || 
|-id=615 bgcolor=#d6d6d6
| 407615 ||  || — || October 21, 2003 || Kitt Peak || Spacewatch || — || align=right | 4.0 km || 
|-id=616 bgcolor=#d6d6d6
| 407616 ||  || — || January 22, 2010 || WISE || WISE || — || align=right | 3.6 km || 
|-id=617 bgcolor=#d6d6d6
| 407617 ||  || — || July 30, 2008 || Kitt Peak || Spacewatch || — || align=right | 4.7 km || 
|-id=618 bgcolor=#d6d6d6
| 407618 ||  || — || August 20, 2008 || Kitt Peak || Spacewatch || Tj (2.99) || align=right | 3.9 km || 
|-id=619 bgcolor=#d6d6d6
| 407619 ||  || — || January 8, 1994 || Kitt Peak || Spacewatch || — || align=right | 2.8 km || 
|-id=620 bgcolor=#d6d6d6
| 407620 ||  || — || February 25, 2006 || Kitt Peak || Spacewatch || — || align=right | 2.8 km || 
|-id=621 bgcolor=#d6d6d6
| 407621 ||  || — || September 19, 2003 || Kitt Peak || Spacewatch || HYG || align=right | 2.7 km || 
|-id=622 bgcolor=#d6d6d6
| 407622 ||  || — || October 14, 2004 || Kitt Peak || Spacewatch || — || align=right | 2.4 km || 
|-id=623 bgcolor=#d6d6d6
| 407623 ||  || — || January 13, 2011 || Kitt Peak || Spacewatch || — || align=right | 3.6 km || 
|-id=624 bgcolor=#d6d6d6
| 407624 ||  || — || September 20, 2003 || Kitt Peak || Spacewatch || — || align=right | 4.2 km || 
|-id=625 bgcolor=#d6d6d6
| 407625 ||  || — || January 16, 2005 || Socorro || LINEAR || — || align=right | 3.8 km || 
|-id=626 bgcolor=#fefefe
| 407626 ||  || — || February 12, 2011 || Catalina || CSS || H || align=right data-sort-value="0.68" | 680 m || 
|-id=627 bgcolor=#d6d6d6
| 407627 ||  || — || November 3, 2004 || Kitt Peak || Spacewatch || — || align=right | 2.8 km || 
|-id=628 bgcolor=#d6d6d6
| 407628 ||  || — || December 10, 2004 || Kitt Peak || Spacewatch || — || align=right | 3.2 km || 
|-id=629 bgcolor=#d6d6d6
| 407629 ||  || — || October 26, 2009 || Mount Lemmon || Mount Lemmon Survey || — || align=right | 3.3 km || 
|-id=630 bgcolor=#d6d6d6
| 407630 ||  || — || December 28, 2005 || Mount Lemmon || Mount Lemmon Survey || — || align=right | 3.7 km || 
|-id=631 bgcolor=#d6d6d6
| 407631 ||  || — || September 6, 2008 || Mount Lemmon || Mount Lemmon Survey || — || align=right | 2.9 km || 
|-id=632 bgcolor=#d6d6d6
| 407632 ||  || — || September 7, 2008 || Mount Lemmon || Mount Lemmon Survey || — || align=right | 3.1 km || 
|-id=633 bgcolor=#d6d6d6
| 407633 ||  || — || September 28, 2008 || Catalina || CSS || 7:4 || align=right | 4.2 km || 
|-id=634 bgcolor=#d6d6d6
| 407634 ||  || — || February 27, 2006 || Kitt Peak || Spacewatch || — || align=right | 2.6 km || 
|-id=635 bgcolor=#d6d6d6
| 407635 ||  || — || February 22, 2006 || Mount Lemmon || Mount Lemmon Survey || — || align=right | 6.1 km || 
|-id=636 bgcolor=#d6d6d6
| 407636 ||  || — || December 5, 1999 || Catalina || CSS || — || align=right | 3.4 km || 
|-id=637 bgcolor=#fefefe
| 407637 ||  || — || February 25, 2011 || Kitt Peak || Spacewatch || H || align=right data-sort-value="0.85" | 850 m || 
|-id=638 bgcolor=#d6d6d6
| 407638 ||  || — || February 25, 2011 || Mount Lemmon || Mount Lemmon Survey || — || align=right | 3.6 km || 
|-id=639 bgcolor=#d6d6d6
| 407639 ||  || — || March 2, 2005 || Catalina || CSS || — || align=right | 4.1 km || 
|-id=640 bgcolor=#d6d6d6
| 407640 ||  || — || October 16, 2009 || Catalina || CSS || — || align=right | 4.1 km || 
|-id=641 bgcolor=#d6d6d6
| 407641 ||  || — || April 1, 2000 || Kitt Peak || Spacewatch || — || align=right | 3.6 km || 
|-id=642 bgcolor=#d6d6d6
| 407642 ||  || — || October 26, 2009 || Mount Lemmon || Mount Lemmon Survey || — || align=right | 4.5 km || 
|-id=643 bgcolor=#d6d6d6
| 407643 ||  || — || April 29, 2006 || Kitt Peak || Spacewatch || THB || align=right | 3.2 km || 
|-id=644 bgcolor=#d6d6d6
| 407644 ||  || — || June 1, 2006 || Mount Lemmon || Mount Lemmon Survey || — || align=right | 4.1 km || 
|-id=645 bgcolor=#d6d6d6
| 407645 ||  || — || October 3, 2003 || Kitt Peak || Spacewatch || — || align=right | 4.3 km || 
|-id=646 bgcolor=#d6d6d6
| 407646 ||  || — || September 29, 2003 || Kitt Peak || Spacewatch || — || align=right | 5.4 km || 
|-id=647 bgcolor=#FA8072
| 407647 ||  || — || April 20, 2006 || Catalina || CSS || H || align=right data-sort-value="0.65" | 650 m || 
|-id=648 bgcolor=#fefefe
| 407648 ||  || — || March 29, 2011 || Kitt Peak || Spacewatch || H || align=right data-sort-value="0.83" | 830 m || 
|-id=649 bgcolor=#d6d6d6
| 407649 ||  || — || January 16, 2005 || Socorro || LINEAR || EUP || align=right | 3.6 km || 
|-id=650 bgcolor=#d6d6d6
| 407650 ||  || — || September 9, 2008 || Mount Lemmon || Mount Lemmon Survey || — || align=right | 3.7 km || 
|-id=651 bgcolor=#d6d6d6
| 407651 ||  || — || March 9, 2005 || Catalina || CSS || — || align=right | 3.3 km || 
|-id=652 bgcolor=#d6d6d6
| 407652 ||  || — || January 27, 2006 || Mount Lemmon || Mount Lemmon Survey || — || align=right | 4.0 km || 
|-id=653 bgcolor=#FFC2E0
| 407653 ||  || — || August 20, 2011 || Haleakala || Pan-STARRS || APO +1km || align=right | 1.4 km || 
|-id=654 bgcolor=#fefefe
| 407654 ||  || — || September 28, 1992 || Kitt Peak || Spacewatch || — || align=right data-sort-value="0.55" | 550 m || 
|-id=655 bgcolor=#fefefe
| 407655 ||  || — || April 11, 2010 || Kitt Peak || Spacewatch || — || align=right data-sort-value="0.80" | 800 m || 
|-id=656 bgcolor=#FFC2E0
| 407656 ||  || — || May 17, 2009 || Kitt Peak || Spacewatch || AMO +1km || align=right data-sort-value="0.81" | 810 m || 
|-id=657 bgcolor=#fefefe
| 407657 ||  || — || November 1, 2008 || Mount Lemmon || Mount Lemmon Survey || — || align=right data-sort-value="0.67" | 670 m || 
|-id=658 bgcolor=#fefefe
| 407658 ||  || — || May 6, 2010 || Mount Lemmon || Mount Lemmon Survey || V || align=right data-sort-value="0.70" | 700 m || 
|-id=659 bgcolor=#fefefe
| 407659 ||  || — || September 23, 2011 || Kitt Peak || Spacewatch || — || align=right data-sort-value="0.72" | 720 m || 
|-id=660 bgcolor=#fefefe
| 407660 ||  || — || December 22, 2008 || Kitt Peak || Spacewatch || — || align=right data-sort-value="0.61" | 610 m || 
|-id=661 bgcolor=#fefefe
| 407661 ||  || — || January 7, 2006 || Kitt Peak || Spacewatch || — || align=right data-sort-value="0.66" | 660 m || 
|-id=662 bgcolor=#fefefe
| 407662 ||  || — || September 8, 2011 || Kitt Peak || Spacewatch || — || align=right data-sort-value="0.72" | 720 m || 
|-id=663 bgcolor=#fefefe
| 407663 ||  || — || September 16, 2004 || Anderson Mesa || LONEOS || — || align=right | 2.1 km || 
|-id=664 bgcolor=#fefefe
| 407664 ||  || — || September 26, 2011 || Kitt Peak || Spacewatch || — || align=right data-sort-value="0.83" | 830 m || 
|-id=665 bgcolor=#fefefe
| 407665 ||  || — || September 19, 2001 || Socorro || LINEAR || — || align=right data-sort-value="0.48" | 480 m || 
|-id=666 bgcolor=#E9E9E9
| 407666 ||  || — || March 31, 2009 || Mount Lemmon || Mount Lemmon Survey || — || align=right | 2.0 km || 
|-id=667 bgcolor=#fefefe
| 407667 ||  || — || October 29, 2008 || Kitt Peak || Spacewatch || — || align=right data-sort-value="0.69" | 690 m || 
|-id=668 bgcolor=#fefefe
| 407668 ||  || — || February 25, 2006 || Kitt Peak || Spacewatch || — || align=right data-sort-value="0.74" | 740 m || 
|-id=669 bgcolor=#fefefe
| 407669 ||  || — || April 14, 2007 || Mount Lemmon || Mount Lemmon Survey || — || align=right data-sort-value="0.55" | 550 m || 
|-id=670 bgcolor=#fefefe
| 407670 ||  || — || December 21, 2008 || Kitt Peak || Spacewatch || — || align=right data-sort-value="0.70" | 700 m || 
|-id=671 bgcolor=#fefefe
| 407671 ||  || — || October 20, 2001 || Socorro || LINEAR || — || align=right data-sort-value="0.68" | 680 m || 
|-id=672 bgcolor=#fefefe
| 407672 ||  || — || October 6, 2004 || Kitt Peak || Spacewatch || — || align=right | 1.3 km || 
|-id=673 bgcolor=#fefefe
| 407673 ||  || — || November 8, 2008 || Mount Lemmon || Mount Lemmon Survey || — || align=right data-sort-value="0.85" | 850 m || 
|-id=674 bgcolor=#fefefe
| 407674 ||  || — || September 16, 2001 || Socorro || LINEAR || — || align=right data-sort-value="0.89" | 890 m || 
|-id=675 bgcolor=#fefefe
| 407675 ||  || — || November 4, 2004 || Kitt Peak || Spacewatch || V || align=right data-sort-value="0.57" | 570 m || 
|-id=676 bgcolor=#fefefe
| 407676 ||  || — || October 17, 2011 || Kitt Peak || Spacewatch || — || align=right data-sort-value="0.84" | 840 m || 
|-id=677 bgcolor=#fefefe
| 407677 ||  || — || September 30, 2011 || Mount Lemmon || Mount Lemmon Survey || — || align=right data-sort-value="0.81" | 810 m || 
|-id=678 bgcolor=#fefefe
| 407678 ||  || — || February 19, 2009 || Kitt Peak || Spacewatch || NYS || align=right data-sort-value="0.51" | 510 m || 
|-id=679 bgcolor=#fefefe
| 407679 ||  || — || November 7, 2008 || Mount Lemmon || Mount Lemmon Survey || — || align=right data-sort-value="0.53" | 530 m || 
|-id=680 bgcolor=#fefefe
| 407680 ||  || — || September 30, 2011 || Kitt Peak || Spacewatch || — || align=right data-sort-value="0.94" | 940 m || 
|-id=681 bgcolor=#fefefe
| 407681 ||  || — || September 30, 2011 || Mount Lemmon || Mount Lemmon Survey || — || align=right data-sort-value="0.67" | 670 m || 
|-id=682 bgcolor=#fefefe
| 407682 ||  || — || November 19, 1998 || Kitt Peak || Spacewatch || — || align=right data-sort-value="0.91" | 910 m || 
|-id=683 bgcolor=#fefefe
| 407683 ||  || — || May 6, 2010 || Mount Lemmon || Mount Lemmon Survey || — || align=right data-sort-value="0.67" | 670 m || 
|-id=684 bgcolor=#fefefe
| 407684 ||  || — || January 20, 2009 || Catalina || CSS || — || align=right data-sort-value="0.77" | 770 m || 
|-id=685 bgcolor=#fefefe
| 407685 ||  || — || January 9, 2006 || Kitt Peak || Spacewatch || — || align=right data-sort-value="0.56" | 560 m || 
|-id=686 bgcolor=#E9E9E9
| 407686 ||  || — || September 29, 2011 || Mount Lemmon || Mount Lemmon Survey || — || align=right | 2.7 km || 
|-id=687 bgcolor=#fefefe
| 407687 ||  || — || October 19, 2011 || Kitt Peak || Spacewatch || (2076) || align=right data-sort-value="0.85" | 850 m || 
|-id=688 bgcolor=#fefefe
| 407688 ||  || — || December 19, 2004 || Kitt Peak || Spacewatch || — || align=right data-sort-value="0.69" | 690 m || 
|-id=689 bgcolor=#fefefe
| 407689 ||  || — || October 19, 2011 || Kitt Peak || Spacewatch || — || align=right | 1.0 km || 
|-id=690 bgcolor=#fefefe
| 407690 ||  || — || October 20, 2011 || Mount Lemmon || Mount Lemmon Survey || V || align=right data-sort-value="0.62" | 620 m || 
|-id=691 bgcolor=#fefefe
| 407691 ||  || — || October 15, 1995 || Kitt Peak || Spacewatch || — || align=right data-sort-value="0.48" | 480 m || 
|-id=692 bgcolor=#fefefe
| 407692 ||  || — || November 20, 2004 || Kitt Peak || Spacewatch || — || align=right data-sort-value="0.59" | 590 m || 
|-id=693 bgcolor=#fefefe
| 407693 ||  || — || October 19, 2011 || Mount Lemmon || Mount Lemmon Survey || — || align=right data-sort-value="0.80" | 800 m || 
|-id=694 bgcolor=#fefefe
| 407694 ||  || — || December 12, 2004 || Kitt Peak || Spacewatch || — || align=right data-sort-value="0.69" | 690 m || 
|-id=695 bgcolor=#fefefe
| 407695 ||  || — || December 30, 2008 || Mount Lemmon || Mount Lemmon Survey || — || align=right data-sort-value="0.61" | 610 m || 
|-id=696 bgcolor=#fefefe
| 407696 ||  || — || November 3, 2007 || Mount Lemmon || Mount Lemmon Survey || — || align=right | 1.0 km || 
|-id=697 bgcolor=#fefefe
| 407697 ||  || — || July 18, 2007 || Mount Lemmon || Mount Lemmon Survey || NYS || align=right data-sort-value="0.53" | 530 m || 
|-id=698 bgcolor=#fefefe
| 407698 ||  || — || September 11, 2001 || Anderson Mesa || LONEOS || — || align=right data-sort-value="0.52" | 520 m || 
|-id=699 bgcolor=#fefefe
| 407699 ||  || — || October 19, 2011 || Mount Lemmon || Mount Lemmon Survey || — || align=right data-sort-value="0.82" | 820 m || 
|-id=700 bgcolor=#fefefe
| 407700 ||  || — || December 2, 2008 || Kitt Peak || Spacewatch || — || align=right data-sort-value="0.62" | 620 m || 
|}

407701–407800 

|-bgcolor=#fefefe
| 407701 ||  || — || December 16, 2004 || Kitt Peak || Spacewatch || — || align=right | 1.2 km || 
|-id=702 bgcolor=#fefefe
| 407702 ||  || — || November 11, 2004 || Kitt Peak || Spacewatch || — || align=right | 1.1 km || 
|-id=703 bgcolor=#E9E9E9
| 407703 ||  || — || March 5, 2010 || WISE || WISE || — || align=right | 2.5 km || 
|-id=704 bgcolor=#fefefe
| 407704 ||  || — || January 1, 2009 || Mount Lemmon || Mount Lemmon Survey || — || align=right data-sort-value="0.76" | 760 m || 
|-id=705 bgcolor=#fefefe
| 407705 ||  || — || June 15, 2010 || Mount Lemmon || Mount Lemmon Survey || V || align=right data-sort-value="0.69" | 690 m || 
|-id=706 bgcolor=#fefefe
| 407706 ||  || — || December 5, 2008 || Mount Lemmon || Mount Lemmon Survey || — || align=right data-sort-value="0.68" | 680 m || 
|-id=707 bgcolor=#fefefe
| 407707 ||  || — || January 23, 2006 || Kitt Peak || Spacewatch || — || align=right data-sort-value="0.77" | 770 m || 
|-id=708 bgcolor=#fefefe
| 407708 ||  || — || October 4, 2004 || Kitt Peak || Spacewatch || — || align=right data-sort-value="0.79" | 790 m || 
|-id=709 bgcolor=#fefefe
| 407709 ||  || — || September 10, 2007 || Mount Lemmon || Mount Lemmon Survey || — || align=right data-sort-value="0.67" | 670 m || 
|-id=710 bgcolor=#fefefe
| 407710 ||  || — || September 27, 2011 || Mount Lemmon || Mount Lemmon Survey || — || align=right data-sort-value="0.87" | 870 m || 
|-id=711 bgcolor=#fefefe
| 407711 ||  || — || October 1, 2011 || Kitt Peak || Spacewatch || — || align=right data-sort-value="0.73" | 730 m || 
|-id=712 bgcolor=#fefefe
| 407712 ||  || — || February 2, 2009 || Mount Lemmon || Mount Lemmon Survey || — || align=right data-sort-value="0.66" | 660 m || 
|-id=713 bgcolor=#fefefe
| 407713 ||  || — || December 21, 2008 || Mount Lemmon || Mount Lemmon Survey || — || align=right data-sort-value="0.54" | 540 m || 
|-id=714 bgcolor=#fefefe
| 407714 ||  || — || October 10, 2004 || Kitt Peak || Spacewatch || — || align=right data-sort-value="0.67" | 670 m || 
|-id=715 bgcolor=#E9E9E9
| 407715 ||  || — || April 18, 2009 || Catalina || CSS || HNS || align=right | 1.4 km || 
|-id=716 bgcolor=#fefefe
| 407716 ||  || — || November 4, 2004 || Catalina || CSS || — || align=right data-sort-value="0.79" | 790 m || 
|-id=717 bgcolor=#fefefe
| 407717 ||  || — || January 29, 2009 || Mount Lemmon || Mount Lemmon Survey || — || align=right data-sort-value="0.71" | 710 m || 
|-id=718 bgcolor=#fefefe
| 407718 ||  || — || January 14, 1999 || Kitt Peak || Spacewatch || — || align=right data-sort-value="0.56" | 560 m || 
|-id=719 bgcolor=#fefefe
| 407719 ||  || — || December 5, 2005 || Mount Lemmon || Mount Lemmon Survey || — || align=right data-sort-value="0.72" | 720 m || 
|-id=720 bgcolor=#fefefe
| 407720 ||  || — || October 21, 2011 || Mount Lemmon || Mount Lemmon Survey || MAS || align=right data-sort-value="0.59" | 590 m || 
|-id=721 bgcolor=#fefefe
| 407721 ||  || — || November 2, 2000 || Kitt Peak || Spacewatch || — || align=right data-sort-value="0.98" | 980 m || 
|-id=722 bgcolor=#fefefe
| 407722 ||  || — || October 17, 2011 || Kitt Peak || Spacewatch || — || align=right data-sort-value="0.67" | 670 m || 
|-id=723 bgcolor=#fefefe
| 407723 ||  || — || September 17, 2004 || Kitt Peak || Spacewatch || — || align=right data-sort-value="0.66" | 660 m || 
|-id=724 bgcolor=#fefefe
| 407724 ||  || — || March 10, 2002 || Kitt Peak || Spacewatch || — || align=right data-sort-value="0.72" | 720 m || 
|-id=725 bgcolor=#fefefe
| 407725 ||  || — || December 1, 2008 || Mount Lemmon || Mount Lemmon Survey || — || align=right data-sort-value="0.66" | 660 m || 
|-id=726 bgcolor=#fefefe
| 407726 ||  || — || October 28, 2011 || Mount Lemmon || Mount Lemmon Survey || — || align=right data-sort-value="0.74" | 740 m || 
|-id=727 bgcolor=#fefefe
| 407727 ||  || — || December 16, 2004 || Kitt Peak || Spacewatch || MAS || align=right data-sort-value="0.58" | 580 m || 
|-id=728 bgcolor=#fefefe
| 407728 ||  || — || February 22, 2009 || Kitt Peak || Spacewatch || — || align=right data-sort-value="0.54" | 540 m || 
|-id=729 bgcolor=#fefefe
| 407729 ||  || — || October 19, 2011 || Kitt Peak || Spacewatch || — || align=right data-sort-value="0.78" | 780 m || 
|-id=730 bgcolor=#fefefe
| 407730 ||  || — || September 20, 2011 || Mount Lemmon || Mount Lemmon Survey || — || align=right data-sort-value="0.69" | 690 m || 
|-id=731 bgcolor=#fefefe
| 407731 ||  || — || October 20, 2008 || Kitt Peak || Spacewatch || — || align=right data-sort-value="0.60" | 600 m || 
|-id=732 bgcolor=#fefefe
| 407732 ||  || — || April 26, 2010 || Mount Lemmon || Mount Lemmon Survey || — || align=right data-sort-value="0.94" | 940 m || 
|-id=733 bgcolor=#fefefe
| 407733 ||  || — || November 24, 2008 || Mount Lemmon || Mount Lemmon Survey || — || align=right data-sort-value="0.74" | 740 m || 
|-id=734 bgcolor=#fefefe
| 407734 ||  || — || January 15, 2009 || Kitt Peak || Spacewatch || — || align=right data-sort-value="0.65" | 650 m || 
|-id=735 bgcolor=#fefefe
| 407735 ||  || — || October 22, 2011 || Mount Lemmon || Mount Lemmon Survey || — || align=right data-sort-value="0.74" | 740 m || 
|-id=736 bgcolor=#fefefe
| 407736 ||  || — || September 16, 2001 || Socorro || LINEAR || — || align=right data-sort-value="0.57" | 570 m || 
|-id=737 bgcolor=#fefefe
| 407737 ||  || — || December 27, 1997 || Kitt Peak || Spacewatch || — || align=right data-sort-value="0.86" | 860 m || 
|-id=738 bgcolor=#fefefe
| 407738 ||  || — || October 25, 2008 || Kitt Peak || Spacewatch || — || align=right data-sort-value="0.66" | 660 m || 
|-id=739 bgcolor=#fefefe
| 407739 ||  || — || December 30, 2000 || Kitt Peak || Spacewatch || — || align=right data-sort-value="0.79" | 790 m || 
|-id=740 bgcolor=#FA8072
| 407740 ||  || — || March 20, 2007 || Mount Lemmon || Mount Lemmon Survey || — || align=right data-sort-value="0.55" | 550 m || 
|-id=741 bgcolor=#fefefe
| 407741 ||  || — || September 2, 1998 || Kitt Peak || Spacewatch || — || align=right data-sort-value="0.64" | 640 m || 
|-id=742 bgcolor=#fefefe
| 407742 ||  || — || October 23, 2011 || Kitt Peak || Spacewatch || — || align=right data-sort-value="0.67" | 670 m || 
|-id=743 bgcolor=#fefefe
| 407743 ||  || — || March 3, 2009 || Mount Lemmon || Mount Lemmon Survey || — || align=right data-sort-value="0.87" | 870 m || 
|-id=744 bgcolor=#fefefe
| 407744 ||  || — || October 9, 2007 || Socorro || LINEAR || — || align=right data-sort-value="0.89" | 890 m || 
|-id=745 bgcolor=#fefefe
| 407745 ||  || — || January 2, 2009 || Kitt Peak || Spacewatch || — || align=right data-sort-value="0.62" | 620 m || 
|-id=746 bgcolor=#fefefe
| 407746 ||  || — || October 7, 2008 || Mount Lemmon || Mount Lemmon Survey || — || align=right data-sort-value="0.68" | 680 m || 
|-id=747 bgcolor=#fefefe
| 407747 ||  || — || May 7, 2006 || Mount Lemmon || Mount Lemmon Survey || — || align=right data-sort-value="0.81" | 810 m || 
|-id=748 bgcolor=#E9E9E9
| 407748 ||  || — || April 19, 2009 || Mount Lemmon || Mount Lemmon Survey || — || align=right | 1.8 km || 
|-id=749 bgcolor=#fefefe
| 407749 ||  || — || August 19, 2001 || Socorro || LINEAR || — || align=right data-sort-value="0.91" | 910 m || 
|-id=750 bgcolor=#E9E9E9
| 407750 ||  || — || November 13, 2007 || Kitt Peak || Spacewatch || — || align=right | 1.1 km || 
|-id=751 bgcolor=#fefefe
| 407751 ||  || — || September 15, 2007 || Kitt Peak || Spacewatch || — || align=right data-sort-value="0.64" | 640 m || 
|-id=752 bgcolor=#fefefe
| 407752 ||  || — || December 18, 2004 || Mount Lemmon || Mount Lemmon Survey || — || align=right data-sort-value="0.69" | 690 m || 
|-id=753 bgcolor=#fefefe
| 407753 ||  || — || November 4, 2004 || Kitt Peak || Spacewatch || — || align=right data-sort-value="0.60" | 600 m || 
|-id=754 bgcolor=#fefefe
| 407754 ||  || — || November 15, 2011 || Kitt Peak || Spacewatch || — || align=right data-sort-value="0.72" | 720 m || 
|-id=755 bgcolor=#E9E9E9
| 407755 ||  || — || February 20, 2009 || Kitt Peak || Spacewatch || (5) || align=right | 1.2 km || 
|-id=756 bgcolor=#d6d6d6
| 407756 ||  || — || March 16, 2007 || Catalina || CSS || — || align=right | 3.4 km || 
|-id=757 bgcolor=#fefefe
| 407757 ||  || — || December 15, 2004 || Campo Imperatore || CINEOS || — || align=right data-sort-value="0.72" | 720 m || 
|-id=758 bgcolor=#fefefe
| 407758 ||  || — || April 26, 2006 || Kitt Peak || Spacewatch || — || align=right data-sort-value="0.79" | 790 m || 
|-id=759 bgcolor=#fefefe
| 407759 ||  || — || January 31, 2009 || Kitt Peak || Spacewatch || — || align=right data-sort-value="0.72" | 720 m || 
|-id=760 bgcolor=#fefefe
| 407760 ||  || — || February 1, 2009 || Kitt Peak || Spacewatch || — || align=right data-sort-value="0.65" | 650 m || 
|-id=761 bgcolor=#fefefe
| 407761 ||  || — || December 30, 2008 || Kitt Peak || Spacewatch || — || align=right data-sort-value="0.54" | 540 m || 
|-id=762 bgcolor=#fefefe
| 407762 ||  || — || February 28, 2009 || Kitt Peak || Spacewatch || — || align=right data-sort-value="0.66" | 660 m || 
|-id=763 bgcolor=#E9E9E9
| 407763 ||  || — || May 11, 2010 || Mount Lemmon || Mount Lemmon Survey || — || align=right | 1.4 km || 
|-id=764 bgcolor=#E9E9E9
| 407764 ||  || — || November 9, 2007 || Kitt Peak || Spacewatch || KON || align=right | 2.8 km || 
|-id=765 bgcolor=#fefefe
| 407765 ||  || — || December 4, 1996 || Kitt Peak || Spacewatch || NYS || align=right data-sort-value="0.68" | 680 m || 
|-id=766 bgcolor=#fefefe
| 407766 ||  || — || November 1, 2007 || Mount Lemmon || Mount Lemmon Survey || — || align=right data-sort-value="0.80" | 800 m || 
|-id=767 bgcolor=#fefefe
| 407767 ||  || — || September 9, 2007 || Anderson Mesa || LONEOS || — || align=right data-sort-value="0.83" | 830 m || 
|-id=768 bgcolor=#fefefe
| 407768 ||  || — || January 31, 2009 || Mount Lemmon || Mount Lemmon Survey || — || align=right data-sort-value="0.66" | 660 m || 
|-id=769 bgcolor=#fefefe
| 407769 ||  || — || September 7, 2004 || Kitt Peak || Spacewatch || — || align=right data-sort-value="0.65" | 650 m || 
|-id=770 bgcolor=#fefefe
| 407770 ||  || — || March 19, 2009 || Mount Lemmon || Mount Lemmon Survey || — || align=right data-sort-value="0.75" | 750 m || 
|-id=771 bgcolor=#fefefe
| 407771 ||  || — || December 18, 2001 || Socorro || LINEAR || — || align=right data-sort-value="0.74" | 740 m || 
|-id=772 bgcolor=#fefefe
| 407772 ||  || — || April 25, 2003 || Kitt Peak || Spacewatch || — || align=right data-sort-value="0.71" | 710 m || 
|-id=773 bgcolor=#fefefe
| 407773 ||  || — || January 7, 2005 || Campo Imperatore || CINEOS || — || align=right data-sort-value="0.77" | 770 m || 
|-id=774 bgcolor=#E9E9E9
| 407774 ||  || — || December 19, 2007 || Mount Lemmon || Mount Lemmon Survey || 526 || align=right | 2.5 km || 
|-id=775 bgcolor=#fefefe
| 407775 ||  || — || September 10, 2007 || Mount Lemmon || Mount Lemmon Survey || NYS || align=right data-sort-value="0.56" | 560 m || 
|-id=776 bgcolor=#fefefe
| 407776 ||  || — || January 18, 2005 || Kitt Peak || Spacewatch || — || align=right data-sort-value="0.86" | 860 m || 
|-id=777 bgcolor=#E9E9E9
| 407777 ||  || — || November 17, 2011 || Kitt Peak || Spacewatch || — || align=right data-sort-value="0.90" | 900 m || 
|-id=778 bgcolor=#fefefe
| 407778 ||  || — || September 2, 2007 || Mount Lemmon || Mount Lemmon Survey || — || align=right data-sort-value="0.68" | 680 m || 
|-id=779 bgcolor=#fefefe
| 407779 ||  || — || September 13, 2007 || Mount Lemmon || Mount Lemmon Survey || — || align=right data-sort-value="0.74" | 740 m || 
|-id=780 bgcolor=#E9E9E9
| 407780 ||  || — || November 18, 2003 || Kitt Peak || Spacewatch || — || align=right | 1.2 km || 
|-id=781 bgcolor=#fefefe
| 407781 ||  || — || March 4, 2005 || Mount Lemmon || Mount Lemmon Survey || MAS || align=right data-sort-value="0.83" | 830 m || 
|-id=782 bgcolor=#fefefe
| 407782 ||  || — || March 9, 2005 || Kitt Peak || Spacewatch || — || align=right data-sort-value="0.89" | 890 m || 
|-id=783 bgcolor=#E9E9E9
| 407783 ||  || — || December 16, 2007 || Mount Lemmon || Mount Lemmon Survey || MAR || align=right | 1.1 km || 
|-id=784 bgcolor=#E9E9E9
| 407784 ||  || — || January 13, 2008 || Mount Lemmon || Mount Lemmon Survey || KON || align=right | 3.2 km || 
|-id=785 bgcolor=#fefefe
| 407785 ||  || — || November 7, 2007 || Catalina || CSS || — || align=right | 1.2 km || 
|-id=786 bgcolor=#E9E9E9
| 407786 ||  || — || August 28, 2006 || Kitt Peak || Spacewatch || — || align=right | 1.3 km || 
|-id=787 bgcolor=#E9E9E9
| 407787 ||  || — || September 28, 2006 || Catalina || CSS || ADE || align=right | 2.2 km || 
|-id=788 bgcolor=#E9E9E9
| 407788 ||  || — || March 31, 2009 || Mount Lemmon || Mount Lemmon Survey || — || align=right | 1.0 km || 
|-id=789 bgcolor=#fefefe
| 407789 ||  || — || November 30, 2003 || Socorro || LINEAR || — || align=right data-sort-value="0.99" | 990 m || 
|-id=790 bgcolor=#fefefe
| 407790 ||  || — || January 17, 2009 || Kitt Peak || Spacewatch || — || align=right data-sort-value="0.64" | 640 m || 
|-id=791 bgcolor=#fefefe
| 407791 ||  || — || October 21, 2003 || Kitt Peak || Spacewatch || NYS || align=right data-sort-value="0.67" | 670 m || 
|-id=792 bgcolor=#E9E9E9
| 407792 ||  || — || October 11, 2010 || Mount Lemmon || Mount Lemmon Survey || — || align=right | 2.0 km || 
|-id=793 bgcolor=#fefefe
| 407793 ||  || — || December 27, 2003 || Socorro || LINEAR || — || align=right | 1.0 km || 
|-id=794 bgcolor=#E9E9E9
| 407794 ||  || — || October 19, 2007 || Mount Lemmon || Mount Lemmon Survey || MAR || align=right | 1.00 km || 
|-id=795 bgcolor=#fefefe
| 407795 ||  || — || October 19, 1999 || Kitt Peak || Spacewatch || — || align=right data-sort-value="0.81" | 810 m || 
|-id=796 bgcolor=#fefefe
| 407796 ||  || — || December 10, 2004 || Kitt Peak || Spacewatch || — || align=right data-sort-value="0.59" | 590 m || 
|-id=797 bgcolor=#E9E9E9
| 407797 ||  || — || November 27, 2011 || Mount Lemmon || Mount Lemmon Survey || — || align=right | 1.2 km || 
|-id=798 bgcolor=#E9E9E9
| 407798 ||  || — || February 10, 2008 || Kitt Peak || Spacewatch || — || align=right | 1.2 km || 
|-id=799 bgcolor=#E9E9E9
| 407799 ||  || — || February 10, 2008 || Kitt Peak || Spacewatch || — || align=right | 1.4 km || 
|-id=800 bgcolor=#E9E9E9
| 407800 ||  || — || April 17, 2005 || Kitt Peak || Spacewatch || — || align=right | 1.0 km || 
|}

407801–407900 

|-bgcolor=#fefefe
| 407801 ||  || — || January 13, 2005 || Kitt Peak || Spacewatch || — || align=right data-sort-value="0.68" | 680 m || 
|-id=802 bgcolor=#E9E9E9
| 407802 ||  || — || February 10, 2008 || Catalina || CSS || (5) || align=right data-sort-value="0.91" | 910 m || 
|-id=803 bgcolor=#E9E9E9
| 407803 ||  || — || December 31, 2011 || Kitt Peak || Spacewatch || — || align=right | 2.9 km || 
|-id=804 bgcolor=#fefefe
| 407804 ||  || — || November 12, 2007 || Mount Lemmon || Mount Lemmon Survey || — || align=right | 1.1 km || 
|-id=805 bgcolor=#fefefe
| 407805 ||  || — || September 12, 2007 || Mount Lemmon || Mount Lemmon Survey || (2076) || align=right data-sort-value="0.77" | 770 m || 
|-id=806 bgcolor=#E9E9E9
| 407806 ||  || — || November 17, 2006 || Kitt Peak || Spacewatch || — || align=right | 1.9 km || 
|-id=807 bgcolor=#fefefe
| 407807 ||  || — || December 3, 2004 || Kitt Peak || Spacewatch || — || align=right data-sort-value="0.67" | 670 m || 
|-id=808 bgcolor=#E9E9E9
| 407808 ||  || — || January 22, 2004 || Socorro || LINEAR || — || align=right data-sort-value="0.92" | 920 m || 
|-id=809 bgcolor=#fefefe
| 407809 ||  || — || September 28, 2003 || Anderson Mesa || LONEOS || — || align=right data-sort-value="0.92" | 920 m || 
|-id=810 bgcolor=#E9E9E9
| 407810 ||  || — || June 3, 2005 || Kitt Peak || Spacewatch || — || align=right | 2.1 km || 
|-id=811 bgcolor=#fefefe
| 407811 ||  || — || December 13, 2007 || Socorro || LINEAR || — || align=right | 1.1 km || 
|-id=812 bgcolor=#E9E9E9
| 407812 ||  || — || February 22, 2004 || Kitt Peak || Spacewatch || (5) || align=right data-sort-value="0.77" | 770 m || 
|-id=813 bgcolor=#E9E9E9
| 407813 ||  || — || October 19, 2007 || Mount Lemmon || Mount Lemmon Survey || MAR || align=right | 1.3 km || 
|-id=814 bgcolor=#fefefe
| 407814 ||  || — || November 2, 2007 || Catalina || CSS || — || align=right data-sort-value="0.96" | 960 m || 
|-id=815 bgcolor=#d6d6d6
| 407815 ||  || — || November 25, 2006 || Mount Lemmon || Mount Lemmon Survey || 615 || align=right | 1.3 km || 
|-id=816 bgcolor=#d6d6d6
| 407816 ||  || — || February 21, 2007 || Mount Lemmon || Mount Lemmon Survey || — || align=right | 2.9 km || 
|-id=817 bgcolor=#d6d6d6
| 407817 ||  || — || January 14, 2012 || Kitt Peak || Spacewatch || — || align=right | 3.5 km || 
|-id=818 bgcolor=#E9E9E9
| 407818 ||  || — || October 3, 2006 || Mount Lemmon || Mount Lemmon Survey || — || align=right | 1.6 km || 
|-id=819 bgcolor=#E9E9E9
| 407819 ||  || — || January 12, 2008 || Kitt Peak || Spacewatch || — || align=right data-sort-value="0.97" | 970 m || 
|-id=820 bgcolor=#fefefe
| 407820 ||  || — || December 16, 2004 || Anderson Mesa || LONEOS || — || align=right data-sort-value="0.89" | 890 m || 
|-id=821 bgcolor=#fefefe
| 407821 ||  || — || September 30, 2003 || Kitt Peak || Spacewatch || — || align=right data-sort-value="0.81" | 810 m || 
|-id=822 bgcolor=#fefefe
| 407822 ||  || — || November 2, 2007 || Mount Lemmon || Mount Lemmon Survey || — || align=right data-sort-value="0.89" | 890 m || 
|-id=823 bgcolor=#fefefe
| 407823 ||  || — || November 19, 2003 || Anderson Mesa || LONEOS || — || align=right | 1.1 km || 
|-id=824 bgcolor=#E9E9E9
| 407824 ||  || — || January 10, 2008 || Mount Lemmon || Mount Lemmon Survey || — || align=right | 1.0 km || 
|-id=825 bgcolor=#d6d6d6
| 407825 ||  || — || January 19, 2012 || Kitt Peak || Spacewatch || — || align=right | 3.0 km || 
|-id=826 bgcolor=#FA8072
| 407826 ||  || — || November 24, 2003 || Anderson Mesa || LONEOS || — || align=right | 1.5 km || 
|-id=827 bgcolor=#fefefe
| 407827 ||  || — || October 19, 2007 || Catalina || CSS || — || align=right data-sort-value="0.75" | 750 m || 
|-id=828 bgcolor=#E9E9E9
| 407828 ||  || — || June 21, 2010 || WISE || WISE || — || align=right | 1.9 km || 
|-id=829 bgcolor=#d6d6d6
| 407829 ||  || — || October 25, 2005 || Kitt Peak || Spacewatch || — || align=right | 3.2 km || 
|-id=830 bgcolor=#E9E9E9
| 407830 ||  || — || October 1, 2010 || Catalina || CSS || — || align=right | 1.1 km || 
|-id=831 bgcolor=#E9E9E9
| 407831 ||  || — || March 26, 2003 || Kitt Peak || Spacewatch || — || align=right | 3.1 km || 
|-id=832 bgcolor=#fefefe
| 407832 ||  || — || September 7, 1999 || Kitt Peak || Spacewatch || — || align=right | 1.1 km || 
|-id=833 bgcolor=#d6d6d6
| 407833 ||  || — || January 19, 2012 || Kitt Peak || Spacewatch || EUP || align=right | 4.3 km || 
|-id=834 bgcolor=#fefefe
| 407834 ||  || — || February 22, 2001 || Kitt Peak || Spacewatch || NYS || align=right data-sort-value="0.88" | 880 m || 
|-id=835 bgcolor=#d6d6d6
| 407835 ||  || — || July 29, 2009 || Kitt Peak || Spacewatch || — || align=right | 3.6 km || 
|-id=836 bgcolor=#E9E9E9
| 407836 ||  || — || June 23, 2009 || Mount Lemmon || Mount Lemmon Survey || — || align=right | 3.0 km || 
|-id=837 bgcolor=#E9E9E9
| 407837 ||  || — || January 1, 2012 || Mount Lemmon || Mount Lemmon Survey || HNS || align=right | 1.3 km || 
|-id=838 bgcolor=#E9E9E9
| 407838 ||  || — || July 7, 2005 || Kitt Peak || Spacewatch || — || align=right | 2.2 km || 
|-id=839 bgcolor=#E9E9E9
| 407839 ||  || — || November 24, 2006 || Mount Lemmon || Mount Lemmon Survey || AST || align=right | 1.6 km || 
|-id=840 bgcolor=#d6d6d6
| 407840 ||  || — || January 1, 2012 || Mount Lemmon || Mount Lemmon Survey || ARM || align=right | 3.8 km || 
|-id=841 bgcolor=#E9E9E9
| 407841 ||  || — || March 10, 2008 || Siding Spring || SSS || — || align=right | 1.9 km || 
|-id=842 bgcolor=#E9E9E9
| 407842 ||  || — || April 19, 2004 || Socorro || LINEAR || — || align=right | 3.6 km || 
|-id=843 bgcolor=#E9E9E9
| 407843 ||  || — || January 18, 2008 || Catalina || CSS || — || align=right | 4.6 km || 
|-id=844 bgcolor=#d6d6d6
| 407844 ||  || — || November 5, 2010 || Mount Lemmon || Mount Lemmon Survey || EOS || align=right | 1.9 km || 
|-id=845 bgcolor=#fefefe
| 407845 ||  || — || December 19, 2001 || Kitt Peak || Spacewatch || — || align=right data-sort-value="0.71" | 710 m || 
|-id=846 bgcolor=#E9E9E9
| 407846 ||  || — || November 19, 2007 || Mount Lemmon || Mount Lemmon Survey || — || align=right data-sort-value="0.93" | 930 m || 
|-id=847 bgcolor=#E9E9E9
| 407847 ||  || — || February 7, 2008 || Kitt Peak || Spacewatch || — || align=right data-sort-value="0.92" | 920 m || 
|-id=848 bgcolor=#E9E9E9
| 407848 ||  || — || January 21, 2012 || Kitt Peak || Spacewatch || — || align=right | 2.5 km || 
|-id=849 bgcolor=#E9E9E9
| 407849 ||  || — || February 12, 1999 || Kitt Peak || Spacewatch || — || align=right | 2.2 km || 
|-id=850 bgcolor=#fefefe
| 407850 ||  || — || December 4, 2007 || Catalina || CSS || (5026) || align=right data-sort-value="0.90" | 900 m || 
|-id=851 bgcolor=#E9E9E9
| 407851 ||  || — || March 5, 1994 || Kitt Peak || Spacewatch || MRX || align=right | 1.1 km || 
|-id=852 bgcolor=#d6d6d6
| 407852 ||  || — || November 12, 2010 || Mount Lemmon || Mount Lemmon Survey || EOS || align=right | 1.9 km || 
|-id=853 bgcolor=#fefefe
| 407853 ||  || — || October 5, 2000 || Kitt Peak || Spacewatch || — || align=right data-sort-value="0.56" | 560 m || 
|-id=854 bgcolor=#E9E9E9
| 407854 ||  || — || September 8, 2010 || Kitt Peak || Spacewatch || — || align=right | 2.4 km || 
|-id=855 bgcolor=#E9E9E9
| 407855 ||  || — || June 29, 2010 || WISE || WISE || HOF || align=right | 2.6 km || 
|-id=856 bgcolor=#d6d6d6
| 407856 ||  || — || April 6, 2008 || Mount Lemmon || Mount Lemmon Survey || — || align=right | 2.2 km || 
|-id=857 bgcolor=#d6d6d6
| 407857 ||  || — || April 14, 2008 || Mount Lemmon || Mount Lemmon Survey || — || align=right | 2.5 km || 
|-id=858 bgcolor=#d6d6d6
| 407858 ||  || — || January 21, 2012 || Kitt Peak || Spacewatch || — || align=right | 2.8 km || 
|-id=859 bgcolor=#E9E9E9
| 407859 ||  || — || February 8, 2008 || Kitt Peak || Spacewatch || — || align=right data-sort-value="0.91" | 910 m || 
|-id=860 bgcolor=#E9E9E9
| 407860 ||  || — || March 27, 2008 || Mount Lemmon || Mount Lemmon Survey || — || align=right | 1.8 km || 
|-id=861 bgcolor=#d6d6d6
| 407861 ||  || — || January 21, 2012 || Kitt Peak || Spacewatch || (5651) || align=right | 3.0 km || 
|-id=862 bgcolor=#E9E9E9
| 407862 ||  || — || September 25, 2006 || Kitt Peak || Spacewatch || — || align=right | 1.3 km || 
|-id=863 bgcolor=#E9E9E9
| 407863 ||  || — || September 14, 2005 || Kitt Peak || Spacewatch || — || align=right | 2.1 km || 
|-id=864 bgcolor=#d6d6d6
| 407864 ||  || — || September 6, 2008 || Mount Lemmon || Mount Lemmon Survey || — || align=right | 4.3 km || 
|-id=865 bgcolor=#d6d6d6
| 407865 ||  || — || March 13, 2007 || Kitt Peak || Spacewatch || — || align=right | 2.5 km || 
|-id=866 bgcolor=#fefefe
| 407866 ||  || — || November 9, 1999 || Socorro || LINEAR || — || align=right | 1.2 km || 
|-id=867 bgcolor=#d6d6d6
| 407867 ||  || — || January 19, 2012 || Kitt Peak || Spacewatch || — || align=right | 3.5 km || 
|-id=868 bgcolor=#d6d6d6
| 407868 ||  || — || October 26, 2005 || Kitt Peak || Spacewatch || — || align=right | 2.9 km || 
|-id=869 bgcolor=#fefefe
| 407869 ||  || — || November 5, 1999 || Kitt Peak || Spacewatch || — || align=right data-sort-value="0.79" | 790 m || 
|-id=870 bgcolor=#d6d6d6
| 407870 ||  || — || March 16, 2007 || Catalina || CSS || Tj (2.99) || align=right | 4.5 km || 
|-id=871 bgcolor=#d6d6d6
| 407871 ||  || — || December 6, 2005 || Kitt Peak || Spacewatch || — || align=right | 2.6 km || 
|-id=872 bgcolor=#E9E9E9
| 407872 ||  || — || March 27, 2008 || Mount Lemmon || Mount Lemmon Survey || — || align=right | 1.5 km || 
|-id=873 bgcolor=#d6d6d6
| 407873 ||  || — || December 7, 2005 || Kitt Peak || Spacewatch || — || align=right | 3.2 km || 
|-id=874 bgcolor=#fefefe
| 407874 ||  || — || January 15, 2008 || Kitt Peak || Spacewatch || — || align=right | 1.1 km || 
|-id=875 bgcolor=#fefefe
| 407875 ||  || — || November 4, 2007 || Mount Lemmon || Mount Lemmon Survey || — || align=right data-sort-value="0.82" | 820 m || 
|-id=876 bgcolor=#E9E9E9
| 407876 ||  || — || September 17, 2010 || Mount Lemmon || Mount Lemmon Survey || — || align=right | 2.1 km || 
|-id=877 bgcolor=#fefefe
| 407877 ||  || — || November 17, 2011 || Kitt Peak || Spacewatch || NYS || align=right data-sort-value="0.68" | 680 m || 
|-id=878 bgcolor=#E9E9E9
| 407878 ||  || — || November 12, 2006 || Mount Lemmon || Mount Lemmon Survey || — || align=right | 1.2 km || 
|-id=879 bgcolor=#fefefe
| 407879 ||  || — || March 31, 2009 || Mount Lemmon || Mount Lemmon Survey || — || align=right | 1.1 km || 
|-id=880 bgcolor=#E9E9E9
| 407880 ||  || — || March 27, 2008 || Kitt Peak || Spacewatch || — || align=right | 1.3 km || 
|-id=881 bgcolor=#d6d6d6
| 407881 ||  || — || February 22, 2007 || Siding Spring || SSS || — || align=right | 4.3 km || 
|-id=882 bgcolor=#fefefe
| 407882 ||  || — || November 9, 1999 || Kitt Peak || Spacewatch || NYS || align=right data-sort-value="0.64" | 640 m || 
|-id=883 bgcolor=#E9E9E9
| 407883 ||  || — || August 28, 2006 || Kitt Peak || Spacewatch || (5) || align=right data-sort-value="0.84" | 840 m || 
|-id=884 bgcolor=#fefefe
| 407884 ||  || — || December 4, 2007 || Catalina || CSS || V || align=right data-sort-value="0.69" | 690 m || 
|-id=885 bgcolor=#E9E9E9
| 407885 ||  || — || November 20, 2006 || Kitt Peak || Spacewatch || — || align=right | 1.4 km || 
|-id=886 bgcolor=#fefefe
| 407886 ||  || — || January 26, 2001 || Kitt Peak || Spacewatch || NYS || align=right data-sort-value="0.61" | 610 m || 
|-id=887 bgcolor=#d6d6d6
| 407887 ||  || — || August 16, 2009 || Kitt Peak || Spacewatch || — || align=right | 2.9 km || 
|-id=888 bgcolor=#fefefe
| 407888 ||  || — || October 20, 1995 || Kitt Peak || Spacewatch || NYS || align=right data-sort-value="0.55" | 550 m || 
|-id=889 bgcolor=#d6d6d6
| 407889 ||  || — || October 17, 2010 || Mount Lemmon || Mount Lemmon Survey || — || align=right | 2.6 km || 
|-id=890 bgcolor=#fefefe
| 407890 ||  || — || November 8, 2007 || Mount Lemmon || Mount Lemmon Survey || MAS || align=right data-sort-value="0.98" | 980 m || 
|-id=891 bgcolor=#fefefe
| 407891 ||  || — || December 13, 2007 || Socorro || LINEAR || (5026) || align=right data-sort-value="0.84" | 840 m || 
|-id=892 bgcolor=#fefefe
| 407892 ||  || — || October 16, 2003 || Kitt Peak || Spacewatch || MAS || align=right data-sort-value="0.47" | 470 m || 
|-id=893 bgcolor=#E9E9E9
| 407893 ||  || — || February 7, 1999 || Kitt Peak || Spacewatch || — || align=right | 1.3 km || 
|-id=894 bgcolor=#fefefe
| 407894 ||  || — || March 16, 2009 || Kitt Peak || Spacewatch || — || align=right data-sort-value="0.81" | 810 m || 
|-id=895 bgcolor=#E9E9E9
| 407895 ||  || — || October 13, 2006 || Kitt Peak || Spacewatch || — || align=right | 1.4 km || 
|-id=896 bgcolor=#d6d6d6
| 407896 ||  || — || March 11, 2007 || Kitt Peak || Spacewatch || — || align=right | 2.7 km || 
|-id=897 bgcolor=#fefefe
| 407897 ||  || — || March 11, 2005 || Kitt Peak || Spacewatch || — || align=right data-sort-value="0.87" | 870 m || 
|-id=898 bgcolor=#fefefe
| 407898 ||  || — || November 11, 2007 || Mount Lemmon || Mount Lemmon Survey || NYS || align=right data-sort-value="0.80" | 800 m || 
|-id=899 bgcolor=#E9E9E9
| 407899 ||  || — || November 20, 2006 || Kitt Peak || Spacewatch || — || align=right | 1.8 km || 
|-id=900 bgcolor=#E9E9E9
| 407900 ||  || — || January 30, 2008 || Mount Lemmon || Mount Lemmon Survey || — || align=right | 1.1 km || 
|}

407901–408000 

|-bgcolor=#E9E9E9
| 407901 ||  || — || February 12, 2008 || Kitt Peak || Spacewatch || — || align=right | 1.4 km || 
|-id=902 bgcolor=#fefefe
| 407902 ||  || — || December 4, 2007 || Kitt Peak || Spacewatch || NYS || align=right data-sort-value="0.74" | 740 m || 
|-id=903 bgcolor=#E9E9E9
| 407903 ||  || — || September 16, 2006 || Kitt Peak || Spacewatch || KON || align=right | 2.2 km || 
|-id=904 bgcolor=#E9E9E9
| 407904 ||  || — || September 15, 2006 || Kitt Peak || Spacewatch || — || align=right data-sort-value="0.82" | 820 m || 
|-id=905 bgcolor=#E9E9E9
| 407905 ||  || — || March 8, 2008 || Mount Lemmon || Mount Lemmon Survey || — || align=right | 1.5 km || 
|-id=906 bgcolor=#d6d6d6
| 407906 ||  || — || December 2, 2010 || Mount Lemmon || Mount Lemmon Survey || — || align=right | 2.4 km || 
|-id=907 bgcolor=#E9E9E9
| 407907 ||  || — || October 9, 2005 || Kitt Peak || Spacewatch || — || align=right | 2.5 km || 
|-id=908 bgcolor=#E9E9E9
| 407908 ||  || — || August 29, 2005 || Kitt Peak || Spacewatch || AGN || align=right | 1.3 km || 
|-id=909 bgcolor=#E9E9E9
| 407909 ||  || — || March 13, 2008 || Catalina || CSS || — || align=right | 2.1 km || 
|-id=910 bgcolor=#d6d6d6
| 407910 ||  || — || March 11, 2007 || Kitt Peak || Spacewatch || — || align=right | 4.0 km || 
|-id=911 bgcolor=#d6d6d6
| 407911 ||  || — || January 31, 2012 || Catalina || CSS || — || align=right | 2.7 km || 
|-id=912 bgcolor=#d6d6d6
| 407912 ||  || — || October 13, 2010 || Mount Lemmon || Mount Lemmon Survey || — || align=right | 2.6 km || 
|-id=913 bgcolor=#E9E9E9
| 407913 ||  || — || December 21, 2006 || Kitt Peak || Spacewatch || — || align=right | 2.1 km || 
|-id=914 bgcolor=#d6d6d6
| 407914 ||  || — || December 10, 2005 || Kitt Peak || Spacewatch || — || align=right | 2.6 km || 
|-id=915 bgcolor=#E9E9E9
| 407915 ||  || — || November 2, 2010 || Mount Lemmon || Mount Lemmon Survey || — || align=right | 1.9 km || 
|-id=916 bgcolor=#fefefe
| 407916 ||  || — || December 25, 1992 || Kitt Peak || Spacewatch || MAS || align=right data-sort-value="0.69" | 690 m || 
|-id=917 bgcolor=#d6d6d6
| 407917 ||  || — || March 1, 1995 || Kitt Peak || Spacewatch || — || align=right | 3.0 km || 
|-id=918 bgcolor=#E9E9E9
| 407918 ||  || — || February 2, 2008 || Kitt Peak || Spacewatch || — || align=right | 1.2 km || 
|-id=919 bgcolor=#E9E9E9
| 407919 ||  || — || August 30, 2005 || Kitt Peak || Spacewatch || — || align=right | 2.3 km || 
|-id=920 bgcolor=#fefefe
| 407920 ||  || — || January 25, 2012 || Kitt Peak || Spacewatch || — || align=right data-sort-value="0.94" | 940 m || 
|-id=921 bgcolor=#d6d6d6
| 407921 ||  || — || December 30, 2005 || Kitt Peak || Spacewatch || — || align=right | 3.1 km || 
|-id=922 bgcolor=#E9E9E9
| 407922 ||  || — || November 13, 2006 || Kitt Peak || Spacewatch || — || align=right | 2.2 km || 
|-id=923 bgcolor=#d6d6d6
| 407923 ||  || — || November 3, 2011 || Kitt Peak || Spacewatch || EUP || align=right | 4.3 km || 
|-id=924 bgcolor=#E9E9E9
| 407924 ||  || — || February 27, 2008 || Mount Lemmon || Mount Lemmon Survey || — || align=right | 1.2 km || 
|-id=925 bgcolor=#fefefe
| 407925 ||  || — || September 17, 2006 || Kitt Peak || Spacewatch || — || align=right | 1.00 km || 
|-id=926 bgcolor=#d6d6d6
| 407926 ||  || — || December 10, 2010 || Mount Lemmon || Mount Lemmon Survey || EOS || align=right | 2.1 km || 
|-id=927 bgcolor=#E9E9E9
| 407927 ||  || — || December 13, 2006 || Mount Lemmon || Mount Lemmon Survey || — || align=right | 2.6 km || 
|-id=928 bgcolor=#E9E9E9
| 407928 ||  || — || March 31, 2008 || Mount Lemmon || Mount Lemmon Survey || — || align=right | 2.3 km || 
|-id=929 bgcolor=#E9E9E9
| 407929 ||  || — || November 24, 2006 || Kitt Peak || Spacewatch || — || align=right | 2.3 km || 
|-id=930 bgcolor=#E9E9E9
| 407930 ||  || — || September 18, 2010 || Mount Lemmon || Mount Lemmon Survey || — || align=right | 2.1 km || 
|-id=931 bgcolor=#d6d6d6
| 407931 ||  || — || November 30, 2005 || Kitt Peak || Spacewatch || — || align=right | 3.3 km || 
|-id=932 bgcolor=#E9E9E9
| 407932 ||  || — || February 3, 2008 || Kitt Peak || Spacewatch || — || align=right | 1.3 km || 
|-id=933 bgcolor=#E9E9E9
| 407933 ||  || — || January 26, 2012 || Mount Lemmon || Mount Lemmon Survey || HOF || align=right | 2.5 km || 
|-id=934 bgcolor=#d6d6d6
| 407934 ||  || — || April 14, 2008 || Mount Lemmon || Mount Lemmon Survey || EOS || align=right | 2.2 km || 
|-id=935 bgcolor=#E9E9E9
| 407935 ||  || — || February 3, 2008 || Kitt Peak || Spacewatch || — || align=right | 1.3 km || 
|-id=936 bgcolor=#d6d6d6
| 407936 ||  || — || December 28, 2011 || Mount Lemmon || Mount Lemmon Survey || — || align=right | 3.9 km || 
|-id=937 bgcolor=#d6d6d6
| 407937 ||  || — || February 2, 2001 || Kitt Peak || Spacewatch || TIR || align=right | 2.3 km || 
|-id=938 bgcolor=#d6d6d6
| 407938 ||  || — || November 14, 2010 || Mount Lemmon || Mount Lemmon Survey || — || align=right | 2.3 km || 
|-id=939 bgcolor=#d6d6d6
| 407939 ||  || — || February 23, 2007 || Kitt Peak || Spacewatch || — || align=right | 2.6 km || 
|-id=940 bgcolor=#d6d6d6
| 407940 ||  || — || December 30, 2005 || Kitt Peak || Spacewatch || — || align=right | 2.6 km || 
|-id=941 bgcolor=#E9E9E9
| 407941 ||  || — || March 7, 2008 || Mount Lemmon || Mount Lemmon Survey || — || align=right | 2.5 km || 
|-id=942 bgcolor=#d6d6d6
| 407942 ||  || — || December 27, 2011 || Mount Lemmon || Mount Lemmon Survey || — || align=right | 3.4 km || 
|-id=943 bgcolor=#E9E9E9
| 407943 ||  || — || March 4, 2008 || Mount Lemmon || Mount Lemmon Survey || — || align=right | 1.4 km || 
|-id=944 bgcolor=#E9E9E9
| 407944 ||  || — || September 27, 2006 || Kitt Peak || Spacewatch || (5) || align=right data-sort-value="0.82" | 820 m || 
|-id=945 bgcolor=#E9E9E9
| 407945 ||  || — || December 1, 2006 || Mount Lemmon || Mount Lemmon Survey || — || align=right | 2.0 km || 
|-id=946 bgcolor=#d6d6d6
| 407946 ||  || — || September 29, 2005 || Anderson Mesa || LONEOS || BRA || align=right | 1.8 km || 
|-id=947 bgcolor=#E9E9E9
| 407947 ||  || — || April 1, 2008 || Mount Lemmon || Mount Lemmon Survey || — || align=right | 2.0 km || 
|-id=948 bgcolor=#E9E9E9
| 407948 ||  || — || February 8, 2008 || Kitt Peak || Spacewatch || EUN || align=right | 1.0 km || 
|-id=949 bgcolor=#d6d6d6
| 407949 ||  || — || January 21, 2012 || Kitt Peak || Spacewatch || — || align=right | 3.2 km || 
|-id=950 bgcolor=#fefefe
| 407950 ||  || — || November 23, 2003 || Kitt Peak || Spacewatch || — || align=right data-sort-value="0.89" | 890 m || 
|-id=951 bgcolor=#d6d6d6
| 407951 ||  || — || August 27, 2009 || Kitt Peak || Spacewatch || — || align=right | 3.3 km || 
|-id=952 bgcolor=#fefefe
| 407952 ||  || — || September 20, 2007 || Kitt Peak || Spacewatch || — || align=right data-sort-value="0.74" | 740 m || 
|-id=953 bgcolor=#E9E9E9
| 407953 ||  || — || March 27, 2008 || Mount Lemmon || Mount Lemmon Survey ||  || align=right | 1.9 km || 
|-id=954 bgcolor=#d6d6d6
| 407954 ||  || — || January 27, 2007 || Mount Lemmon || Mount Lemmon Survey || — || align=right | 2.5 km || 
|-id=955 bgcolor=#E9E9E9
| 407955 ||  || — || October 14, 2010 || Mount Lemmon || Mount Lemmon Survey || — || align=right | 1.7 km || 
|-id=956 bgcolor=#E9E9E9
| 407956 ||  || — || February 10, 2008 || Mount Lemmon || Mount Lemmon Survey || — || align=right | 1.8 km || 
|-id=957 bgcolor=#E9E9E9
| 407957 ||  || — || October 28, 2010 || Catalina || CSS || — || align=right | 2.0 km || 
|-id=958 bgcolor=#d6d6d6
| 407958 ||  || — || March 13, 2007 || Kitt Peak || Spacewatch || — || align=right | 2.3 km || 
|-id=959 bgcolor=#d6d6d6
| 407959 ||  || — || January 19, 2012 || Kitt Peak || Spacewatch || EOS || align=right | 1.6 km || 
|-id=960 bgcolor=#d6d6d6
| 407960 ||  || — || January 28, 2006 || Catalina || CSS || — || align=right | 4.7 km || 
|-id=961 bgcolor=#E9E9E9
| 407961 ||  || — || March 24, 2003 || Kitt Peak || Spacewatch || AEO || align=right | 1.2 km || 
|-id=962 bgcolor=#d6d6d6
| 407962 ||  || — || April 10, 2002 || Socorro || LINEAR || — || align=right | 3.5 km || 
|-id=963 bgcolor=#E9E9E9
| 407963 ||  || — || December 15, 2006 || Kitt Peak || Spacewatch || — || align=right | 2.0 km || 
|-id=964 bgcolor=#d6d6d6
| 407964 ||  || — || March 26, 2007 || Kitt Peak || Spacewatch || EOS || align=right | 2.0 km || 
|-id=965 bgcolor=#d6d6d6
| 407965 ||  || — || September 30, 2009 || Mount Lemmon || Mount Lemmon Survey || — || align=right | 3.2 km || 
|-id=966 bgcolor=#E9E9E9
| 407966 ||  || — || March 5, 2008 || Mount Lemmon || Mount Lemmon Survey || — || align=right | 1.0 km || 
|-id=967 bgcolor=#E9E9E9
| 407967 ||  || — || March 18, 2004 || Kitt Peak || Spacewatch || EUN || align=right | 1.1 km || 
|-id=968 bgcolor=#d6d6d6
| 407968 ||  || — || February 21, 2012 || Kitt Peak || Spacewatch || EOS || align=right | 2.1 km || 
|-id=969 bgcolor=#d6d6d6
| 407969 ||  || — || October 24, 2003 || Socorro || LINEAR || — || align=right | 4.2 km || 
|-id=970 bgcolor=#d6d6d6
| 407970 ||  || — || September 23, 2009 || Mount Lemmon || Mount Lemmon Survey || EOS || align=right | 2.2 km || 
|-id=971 bgcolor=#d6d6d6
| 407971 ||  || — || September 18, 2003 || Kitt Peak || Spacewatch || VER || align=right | 2.6 km || 
|-id=972 bgcolor=#d6d6d6
| 407972 ||  || — || September 26, 2009 || Kitt Peak || Spacewatch || — || align=right | 2.4 km || 
|-id=973 bgcolor=#E9E9E9
| 407973 ||  || — || January 17, 2007 || Kitt Peak || Spacewatch || AGN || align=right | 1.2 km || 
|-id=974 bgcolor=#d6d6d6
| 407974 ||  || — || March 5, 2006 || Kitt Peak || Spacewatch || — || align=right | 2.9 km || 
|-id=975 bgcolor=#d6d6d6
| 407975 ||  || — || August 29, 2009 || Kitt Peak || Spacewatch || — || align=right | 2.3 km || 
|-id=976 bgcolor=#d6d6d6
| 407976 ||  || — || August 15, 2009 || Kitt Peak || Spacewatch || — || align=right | 3.6 km || 
|-id=977 bgcolor=#d6d6d6
| 407977 ||  || — || October 25, 2005 || Mount Lemmon || Mount Lemmon Survey || KOR || align=right | 1.4 km || 
|-id=978 bgcolor=#d6d6d6
| 407978 ||  || — || March 10, 2007 || Mount Lemmon || Mount Lemmon Survey || — || align=right | 2.3 km || 
|-id=979 bgcolor=#E9E9E9
| 407979 ||  || — || November 16, 2006 || Kitt Peak || Spacewatch || — || align=right | 1.6 km || 
|-id=980 bgcolor=#d6d6d6
| 407980 ||  || — || October 30, 2009 || Mount Lemmon || Mount Lemmon Survey || EOS || align=right | 2.5 km || 
|-id=981 bgcolor=#E9E9E9
| 407981 ||  || — || September 20, 1995 || Kitt Peak || Spacewatch || AGN || align=right | 1.4 km || 
|-id=982 bgcolor=#d6d6d6
| 407982 ||  || — || September 21, 2008 || Catalina || CSS || 7:4 || align=right | 4.6 km || 
|-id=983 bgcolor=#d6d6d6
| 407983 ||  || — || October 18, 1995 || Kitt Peak || Spacewatch || KOR || align=right | 1.4 km || 
|-id=984 bgcolor=#d6d6d6
| 407984 ||  || — || August 18, 2009 || Kitt Peak || Spacewatch || EOS || align=right | 2.0 km || 
|-id=985 bgcolor=#d6d6d6
| 407985 ||  || — || April 25, 2007 || Mount Lemmon || Mount Lemmon Survey || — || align=right | 3.1 km || 
|-id=986 bgcolor=#d6d6d6
| 407986 ||  || — || December 30, 2005 || Kitt Peak || Spacewatch || — || align=right | 2.7 km || 
|-id=987 bgcolor=#E9E9E9
| 407987 ||  || — || March 26, 2003 || Kitt Peak || Spacewatch || — || align=right | 2.4 km || 
|-id=988 bgcolor=#d6d6d6
| 407988 ||  || — || November 16, 2010 || Mount Lemmon || Mount Lemmon Survey || — || align=right | 2.9 km || 
|-id=989 bgcolor=#E9E9E9
| 407989 ||  || — || November 17, 2006 || Kitt Peak || Spacewatch || — || align=right | 2.2 km || 
|-id=990 bgcolor=#d6d6d6
| 407990 ||  || — || April 20, 2007 || Kitt Peak || Spacewatch || — || align=right | 2.5 km || 
|-id=991 bgcolor=#d6d6d6
| 407991 ||  || — || December 2, 2005 || Kitt Peak || Spacewatch || EOS || align=right | 2.7 km || 
|-id=992 bgcolor=#d6d6d6
| 407992 ||  || — || February 25, 2012 || Mount Lemmon || Mount Lemmon Survey || — || align=right | 1.9 km || 
|-id=993 bgcolor=#d6d6d6
| 407993 ||  || — || February 25, 2007 || Mount Lemmon || Mount Lemmon Survey || — || align=right | 2.3 km || 
|-id=994 bgcolor=#d6d6d6
| 407994 ||  || — || January 6, 2006 || Kitt Peak || Spacewatch || — || align=right | 3.6 km || 
|-id=995 bgcolor=#d6d6d6
| 407995 ||  || — || March 2, 2006 || Catalina || CSS || — || align=right | 4.8 km || 
|-id=996 bgcolor=#E9E9E9
| 407996 ||  || — || October 10, 2010 || Kitt Peak || Spacewatch || — || align=right | 2.8 km || 
|-id=997 bgcolor=#E9E9E9
| 407997 ||  || — || September 15, 2010 || Mount Lemmon || Mount Lemmon Survey || — || align=right | 1.7 km || 
|-id=998 bgcolor=#d6d6d6
| 407998 ||  || — || August 20, 2009 || Kitt Peak || Spacewatch || EOS || align=right | 1.9 km || 
|-id=999 bgcolor=#d6d6d6
| 407999 ||  || — || February 25, 2006 || Mount Lemmon || Mount Lemmon Survey || — || align=right | 3.0 km || 
|-id=000 bgcolor=#E9E9E9
| 408000 ||  || — || April 9, 2003 || Kitt Peak || Spacewatch || — || align=right | 2.3 km || 
|}

References

External links 
 Discovery Circumstances: Numbered Minor Planets (405001)–(410000) (IAU Minor Planet Center)

0407